= Argument from fallacy =

Fallacy that since an argument contains a logical fallacy, its conclusion must be false

Argument from fallacy is the formal fallacy of analyzing an argument and inferring that, since it contains a fallacy, its conclusion must be false. It is also called argument to logic (argumentum ad logicam), the fallacy fallacy, the fallacist's fallacy, and the bad reasons fallacy.

== Form ==
An argument from fallacy has the following general argument form:

If P, then Q.
P is a fallacious argument.
Therefore, Q is false.

Thus, it is a special case of denying the antecedent where the antecedent, rather than being a proposition that is false, is an entire argument that is fallacious. A fallacious argument, just as with a false antecedent, can still have a consequent that happens to be true. The fallacy is in concluding the consequent of a fallacious argument has to be false.

That the argument is fallacious only means that the argument cannot succeed in proving its consequent. But showing how one argument in a complex thesis is fallaciously reasoned does not necessarily invalidate its conclusion if that conclusion is not dependent on the fallacy.

== Examples ==
Alice: All cats are animals. Ginger is an animal. Therefore, Ginger is a cat.
Bob: You have just fallaciously affirmed the consequent. You are incorrect. Therefore, Ginger is not a cat.

Alice: I speak English. Therefore, I am English.
Bob: Americans and Canadians, among others, speak English too. By assuming that speaking English and being English always go together, you have just committed the package-deal fallacy. You are incorrect. Therefore, you are not English.

Both of Bob's rebuttals are arguments from fallacy. Ginger may or may not be a cat, and Alice may or may not be English. The fact that Alice's argument was fallacious is not, in itself, proof that her conclusion is false.

Charlie: Bob's argument that Ginger is not a cat is fallacious. Therefore, Ginger absolutely must be a cat.

That one can invoke the argument from fallacy against a position does not prove one's own position either, as this would also be an argument from fallacy, as is the case in Charlie's argument.

== Further ==
Argumentum ad logicam can be used as an ad hominem appeal: by impugning the opponent's credibility or good faith, it can be used to sway the audience by undermining the speaker rather than by addressing the speaker's argument.

William Lycan identifies the fallacy fallacy as the fallacy "of imputing fallaciousness to a view with which one disagrees but without doing anything to show that the view rests on any error of reasoning". Unlike ordinary fallacy fallacies, which reason from an argument's fallaciousness to its conclusion's falsehood, the kind of argument Lycan has in mind treats another argument's fallaciousness as obvious without first demonstrating that any fallacy at all is present. Thus in some contexts it may be a form of begging the question, and it is also a special case of ad lapidem.

== See also ==
- Argument from ignorance (argumentum ad ignorantiam)
- Argumentation theory
- Genetic fallacy
- Logical extreme
- Logical fallacies
- Reductio ad absurdum
- Straw man
- Vacuous truth
- Absence of evidence is not evidence of absence
