= Attacking Faulty Reasoning =

Textbook on logical fallacies by T. Edward Damer

- Author: T. Edward Damer
- Publisher: Wadsworth Publishing Company
- Publication date: 1980
- ISBN: 9780534217501

Attacking Faulty Reasoning: A Practical Guide to Fallacy-free Arguments is a textbook on logical fallacies by T. Edward Damer that has been used for many years in a number of college courses on logic, critical thinking, argumentation, and philosophy. It explains 60 of the most commonly committed fallacies. Each of the fallacies is concisely defined and illustrated with several relevant examples. For each fallacy, the text gives suggestions about how to address or to "attack" the fallacy when it is encountered. The organization of the fallacies comes from the author’s own fallacy theory, which defines a fallacy as a violation of one of the five criteria of a good argument:

- the argument must be structurally well-formed;
- the premises must be relevant;
- the premises must be acceptable;
- the premises must be sufficient in number, weight, and kind;
- there must be an effective rebuttal of challenges to the argument.

Each fallacy falls into at least one of Damer's five fallacy categories, which derive from the above criteria.

The text was first published in 1980, while the third edition was published in 1995.

== The five fallacy categories ==
- Fallacies that violate the structural criterion. The structural criterion requires that one who argues for or against a position should use an argument that meets the fundamental structural requirements of a well-formed argument, using premises that are compatible with one another, that do not contradict the conclusion, that do not assume the truth of the conclusion, and that are not involved in any faulty deductive inference. Fallacies such as begging the question, denying the antecedent, or undistributed middle violate this criterion.
- Fallacies that violate the relevance criterion. The relevance criterion requires that one who presents an argument for or against a position should attempt to set forth only reasons that are directly related to the merit of the position at issue. Fallacies such as appeal to tradition, appeal to force, or genetic fallacy fail to meet the argumentative demands of relevance.
- Fallacies that violate the acceptability criterion. The acceptability criterion requires that one who presents an argument for or against a position should attempt to use reasons that are likely to be accepted by a rationally mature person and that meet the standard criteria of acceptability. Fallacies such as equivocation, fallacy of division, and wishful thinking are unacceptable because they are based on linguistic confusion or involve unacceptable assumptions.
- Fallacies that violate the sufficiency criterion. The sufficiency criterion requires that one who presents an argument for or against a position should attempt to provide reasons that are sufficient in number, kind, and weight to support the acceptance of the conclusion. Fallacies such as argument from ignorance, special pleading, and the post hoc fallacy violate this criterion because they are arguments that are missing important evidence or make causal assumptions based on insufficient evidence.
- Fallacies that violate the rebuttal criterion. The rebuttal criterion requires that one who presents an argument for or against a position should attempt to provide an effective rebuttal to all serious challenges to the argument or the position it supports and to the strongest arguments for viable alternative positions. Fallacies such as red herring, straw man, and poisoning the well fail to meet this criterion because they attack the arguer rather than the argument or use argumentative devices that divert attention away from the issue at stake.

The text also sets forth 12 principles that constitute a "Code of Conduct for Effective Discussion." This code incorporates Damer’s fallacy theory and provides a procedural and ethical standard for the development of an effective intellectual style to be used when engaging in a rational discussion of important issues.

== See also ==
- Argument
- Argumentation
- Critical thinking
- Fallacy
- Logical reasoning
