= Tafasta merube lo tafasta =

Talmudic idiom

Tafasta merube lo tafasta (Hebrew: תָּפַסְתָּ מְרֻבֶּה, לֹא תָּפַסְתָּ, "If you have seized a lot, you have not seized") is a Talmudic idiom used to express the idea that when it is possible to take a particular law from two different sources, it should be taken from the narrower of the two, in order to stay on the safe side and avoid making assumptions about which is correct. It is akin to the logical concept of "proving too much".

The phrase is used somewhat differently in modern Hebrew, to the effect of "if you try to do too much of something, you might fail to do it altogether". For example: "You shouldn't take that many courses, you'll end up failing them all - tafasta merube, lo tafasta".

== Terminology and meaning ==
The entire phrase actually includes both a positive and a negative expression: תפסת מרובה לא תפסת, תפסת מועט תפסת - "If you have seized a lot, you have not seized; if you have seized a little, you have seized." The general meaning is that an over-ambitious claim defeats itself: the intended analogy is to one who grabs more than he can hold.

=== Examples ===
- The Talmud, after determining that food impurity applies only to an egg's volume of food, questions which egg is meant: perhaps the enormous egg of the mythical Bar Juchne bird, rather than an ordinary chicken egg? It replies tafasta merube lo tafasta, meaning: in cases of uncertainty, go with the smaller amount, in this case meaning a chicken egg.
- The Temple peace-offering may be brought for seven days on Passover and eight days on Sukkot. The Talmud determines that on Shavuot, too, the peace-offering may be brought for seven or eight days. Initially it is unsure if the correct number is seven or eight, but it settles on the smaller number (seven), due to tafasta merube lo tafasta.

== See also ==
- Jack of all trades, master of none
- Proving too much
- Reductio ad absurdum
