= Rory Sutherland =

Rory Sutherland may refer to:

- Rory Sutherland (advertising executive) (born 1965), British advertising executive
- Rory Sutherland (cyclist) (born 1982), Australian cyclist
- Rory Sutherland (rugby union) (born 1994), Scottish rugby player
