= Mockery =

Act of insulting or making light of a person or other thing

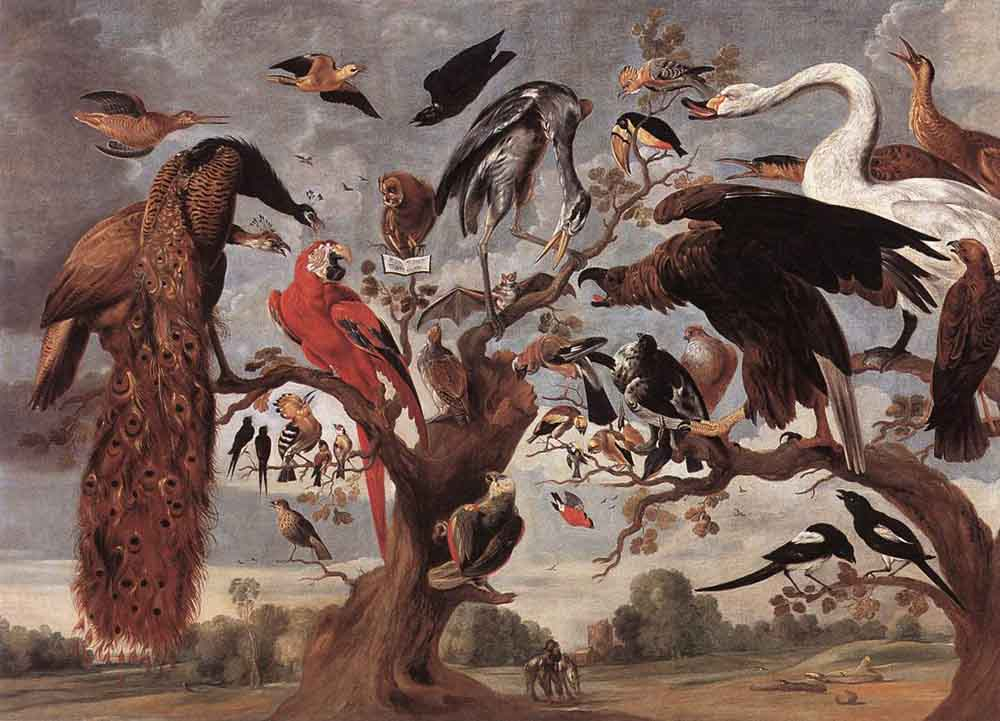
The Mockery of the Owl: a 17th-century painting by Jan van Kessel the Elder, loosely depicting a scene from the 13th-century poem, The Owl and the Nightingale, in which the owl is mocked for its characteristics by other birds.

Mockery or mocking is the act of insulting or making light of a person or other thing, sometimes merely by taunting, but often by making a caricature, purporting to engage in imitation in a way that highlights unflattering characteristics. Mockery can be done in a lighthearted and gentle way, but can also be cruel and hateful, such that it "conjures images of corrosion, deliberate degradation, even subversion; thus, 'to laugh at in contempt, to make sport of' (OED)". Mockery appears to be unique to humans, and serves a number of psychological functions, such as reducing the perceived imbalance of power between authority figures and common people. Examples of mockery can be found in literature and the arts.

== Etymology and function ==
The root word mock traces to the Old French mocquer (later moquer), meaning to scoff at, laugh at, deride, or fool, although the origin of mocquer is itself unknown. Labeling a person or thing as a mockery may also be used to imply that it or they are a poor quality or counterfeit version of some genuine other, such as the case in the usages: "mockery of man" or "the trial was a mockery of justice".

=== Mockery in psychology ===
Australian linguistics professor Michael Haugh differentiated between teasing and mockery by emphasizing that, while the two do have substantial overlap in meaning, mockery does not connote repeated provocation or the intentional withholding of desires, and instead implies a type of imitation or impersonation where a key element is that the nature of the act places a central importance on the expectation that it not be taken seriously. Specifically in examining non-serious forms of jocular mockery, Haugh summarized the literature on the features of mockery as consisting of the following:

- Laughter, especially on the part of the speaker, acting as a cue that others are invited to laugh also
- Phonetic practices, such as a "smile voice" and modulating "sing-song" pitch which mark actions "as laughable", denote an exaggerated level of animation, and indicate irony
- Facial cues, such as smiling, winking or other intentionally exaggerated expressions which mark actions as laughable, ironic, and non-serious
- Bodily cues, such as covering the face, or clapping
- Exaggeration, emphasizing extreme cases and making claims obviously above or below what is reasonable
- Incongruity through allusions and presuppositions to create implicit contrast
- Formulaicity and "topic shift markers" to indicate an end to non-seriousness and a return to serious interaction

In turn, the audience of the mockery may reply with a number of additional cues to indicate that the actions are understood as non-serious, including laughter, explicit agreement, or a continuation or elaboration of the mockery.

Jayne Raisborough and Matt Adams alternatively identified mockery as a type of disparagement humour mainly available as a tool of privileged groups, which ensures normative responses from non-privileged groups. They emphasize that mockery may be used ironically and comedically, to identify moral stigma and signal moral superiority, but also as a form of social encouragement, allowing those who are providing social cues, to do so in a way that provides a level of social distance between the criticism and critic through use of parody and satire. In this way, mockery can function as a "more superficially 'respectable', morally sensitive way of doing class-based distinction than less civil disgust."

=== Mockery in philosophy ===
The philosopher Baruch Spinoza took a dim view of mockery, contending that it rests "upon a false opinion and proclaim[s] the imperfection of the mocker". He reasoned that either the object of the mockery is not ridiculous, in which case the mocker is wrong in treating it in such a way, or it is ridiculous, in which case mockery is not an effective tool for improvement. Though the mocker reveals that they recognize the imperfection, they do nothing to resolve it using good reason. Writing in his Tractatus Politicus, Spinoza declared that mockery was a form of hatred and sadness "which can never be converted into joy".

Catholic Bishop Francis de Sales, in his 1877 Introduction to the Devout Life, decried mockery as a sin:

But as derision or mockery are never without scoffing, therefore it is a very great sin; so that divines are right in saying that mockery is the worst kind of offence a man can be guilty of against his neighbour by words; for other offences may be committed with some esteem for the party offended, but this is committed with scorn and contempt.

Alternatively, while philosophers John Locke and Anthony Ashley-Cooper, 3rd Earl of Shaftesbury agreed on the importance of critical inquiry regarding the views of authority figures, Shaftesbury saw an important role specifically for mockery in this process. Shaftesbury held that "a moderate use of mockery could correct vices," and that mockery was among the most important challenges for truth, because "if an opinion cannot stand mockery" then it similarly would be "revealed to be ridiculous". As such all serious claims of knowledge should be subjected to it. This was a view echoed by René Descartes, who saw mockery as a "trait of a good man" which "bears witness to the cheerfulness of his temper ... tranquility of his soul ... [and] the ingenuity of his mind."

In philosophical argument, the appeal to ridicule (also called appeal to mockery, ab absurdo, or the horse laugh) is an informal fallacy which presents an opponent's argument as absurd, ridiculous, or humorous, and therefore not worthy of serious consideration. Appeal to ridicule is often found in the form of comparing a nuanced circumstance or argument to a laughably commonplace occurrence or to some other irrelevancy on the basis of comedic timing, wordplay, or making an opponent and their argument the object of a joke. This is a rhetorical tactic that mocks an opponent's argument or standpoint, attempting to inspire an emotional reaction (making it a type of appeal to emotion) in the audience and to highlight any counter-intuitive aspects of that argument, making it appear foolish and contrary to common sense. This is typically done by making a mockery of the argument's foundation that represents it in an uncharitable and oversimplified way.

=== Mockery in the arts ===
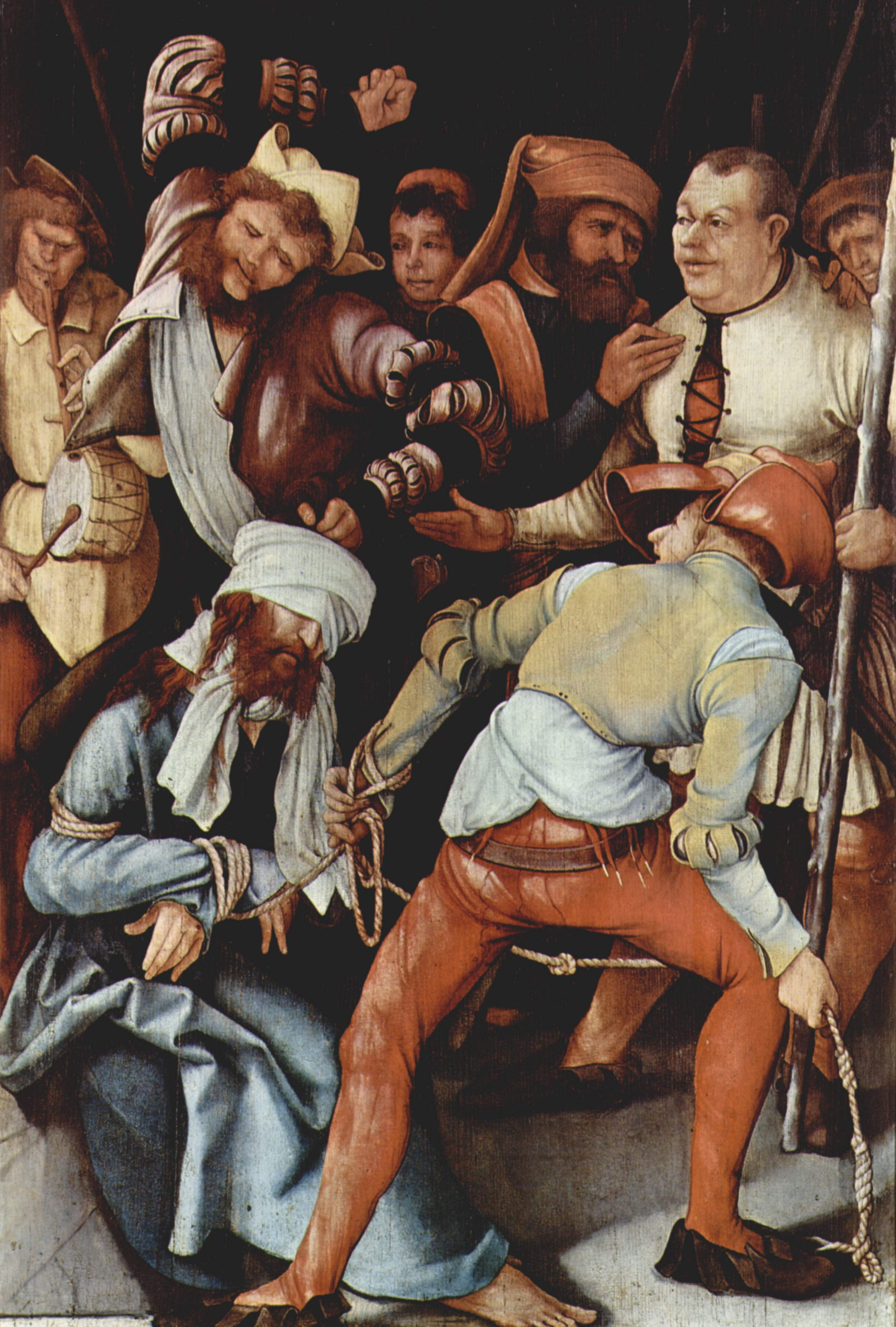
The mocking of Jesus, here as depicted by Matthias Grünewald, is an historically popular theme for artists.

Mockery is one form of the literary genre of satire, and it has been noted that "[t]he mock genres and the practice of literary mockery goes back at least as far as the sixth century BCE". Mockery, as a genre, can also be directed towards other artistic genres:

[T]o parody another work, or other works, does often entail an evaluative stance towards the material being referred to, as it generally involves mockery. Within this mocking cultural mode there nevertheless exist degrees of criticism, from gentle mockery to acerbic ridicule. Such mockery can, however, exist alongside a more loving stance toward the object being mocked on occasions. An example of such loving mockery can be found in the cult film This Is Spinal Tap; while the film makes fun of some of the ridiculous aspects associated with heavy metal music, there is also an evident fondness for the culture and, in particular, for the characters.

The English comedy troupe, Monty Python, was considered to be particularly adept at the mockery of both authority figures and people making a pretense to competence beyond their abilities. One such sketch, involving a nearly-deaf hearing aid salesman and a nearly-blind contact lens salesman, depicts them as "both desperately unsuccessful, and exceedingly hilarious. The comicality of such characters is largely due to the fact that the objects of mockery themselves create a specific context in which we find that they deserve being ridiculed". In the United States, the television show, Saturday Night Live has been noted as having "a history of political mockery", and it has been proposed that "[h]istorical and rhetorical analyses argue that this mockery matters" with respect to political outcomes.

== Development in humans ==
Mockery appears to be a uniquely human activity. Although several species of animal are observed to engage in laughter, humans are the only animal observed to use laughter to mock one another.

An examination of the appearance of the capacity for mockery during childhood development indicates that mockery "does not appear as an expectable moment in early childhood, but becomes more prominent as the latency child enters the social world of sibling rivalry, competition, and social interaction". As it develops, it is "displayed in forms of schoolyard bullying and certainly in adolescence with the attempt to achieve independence while negotiating the conflicts arising out of encounters with authority." One common element of mockery is caricature, a wide-ranging practice of imitating and exaggerating aspects of the subject being mocked. It has been suggested that caricature produced "survival advantages of rapid decoding of facial information", and at the same time that it provides "some of our best humor and, when suffused with too much aggression, may reach the form of mockery". Mockery serves a number of social functions:

Primitive forms of mockery represent the attempt to use aggression to protect oneself from engulfment, impingement or humiliation by diminishing the perceived power and threat of the other. However, mockery may also preserve the object relationship, because the other is needed to provide the material for caricature. Caricature in everyday life, at its most effective, involves the sublimation of aggression and may reach the form of humor— witness our fascination with political satire, often an exercise in the caricature of authority. Less sublimated aggression results in a type of mockery directed at the ongoing humiliation of the weak, reminding such persons that they have little power and are not worthy of full humanity or social membership.

Richard Borshay Lee reported mockery as a facet of Bushmen culture designed to keep individuals who are successful in certain regards from becoming arrogant. When weaker people are mocked by stronger people, this can constitute a form of bullying.

== See also ==
- Bullying
- Irony
- Roast (comedy)
- Sarcasm
- Taunting
- Tongue-in-cheek
- Ad hominem
