= Poisoning the well (disambiguation) =

Poisoning the well (or to poison the well) is a logical fallacy.

Poisoning the well may also refer to:

- Well poisoning, the literal meaning of the phrase
- "Poisoning the Well", a Stargate Atlantis episode
- Poison the Well (band), a hardcore punk band from Florida formed in 1997
- "Poison the Well", a 2019 song by American band Modest Mouse
