= Logical extreme =

A logical extreme is a useful, though sometimes fallacious, rhetorical device for the disputation of propositions. Quite simply, a logical extreme is the relevant statement of an extreme or preposterous position that is consistent with the proposition in question. Therefore, as the logically extreme position is both relevant and untenable, it has succeeded in calling the proposition into question, at least in its stated form. An example is in Basil Liddell Hart's essay Armed Forces and the Art of War: Armies in The New Cambridge Modern History:

The worst effect of Clausewitz's views came through his metaphysical exposition of the idea of 'absolute' warfare. By taking the logical extreme as the theoretical ideal, he conveyed to superficial readers that the road to success was through the unlimited application of force. [...] Moreover, Clausewitz contributed to the subsequent decay of generalship when in an oft-quoted passage he wrote--'Philanthropists may easily imagine that there is a skilful method of disarming and overcoming the enemy without great bloodshed, and that this is the proper tendency of the Art of War....It is an error which must be extirpated.' [...] Unfortunately, Clausewitz's corrective arguments would henceforth be cited by countless blunderers to excuse and even to justify, their futile squandering of life in bull-headed assaults.

— J.P.T. Bury (ed), The New Cambridge Modern History, Book X: The Zenith of European: 1830-70

== See also ==
- Reductio ad absurdum
