= Ergo decedo =

Logical fallacy

Ergo decedo, Latin for "therefore I leave" or "then I go off", a truncation of argumentum ergo decedo, and colloquially denominated the traitorous critic fallacy, denotes responding to the criticism of a critic by implying that the critic is motivated by undisclosed favorability or affiliation to an out-group, rather than responding to the criticism itself. The fallacy implicitly alleges that the critic does not appreciate the values and customs of the criticized group or is traitorous, and thus suggests that the critic should avoid the question or topic entirely, typically by leaving the criticized group.

Argumentum ergo decedo is generally categorized as a type of informal fallacy and more specifically as a species of the subclass of ad hominem informal fallacies.

== In politics ==
Argumentum ergo decedo is directly related to the tu quoque fallacy when responding to political criticism. As whataboutism is used against external criticism, ergo decedo is used against internal criticism.

== See also ==
- List of logical fallacies
- Ad hominem
- No True Scotsman
- Tu quoque
- Whataboutism
