= Retrospective determinism =

Informal fallacy

Retrospective determinism is the informal fallacy that because something happened under some circumstances, it was therefore bound to happen due to those circumstances; the term was coined by the French philosopher Henri Bergson.

The classic example is Caesar was assassinated when he declared himself dictator. Sic semper tyrannis: this goes to show that all dictators will eventually be assassinated. Not only is this irrational, it is factually false. Were this an argument, it would give no rational grounds on which to conclude that Caesar’s assassination was the only possible outcome, or even the most likely outcome under the circumstances. This type of fallacy can precede a hasty generalization: because something happened in given circumstances, it was not only bound to happen, but will in fact always happen given those circumstances.

College students are prone to making the fallacy of retrospective determination.

== Examples ==
For some other examples, see:

1. That Apartheid was going to fall. Without internal agitation and international pressure, apartheid might not have collapsed, either in the same way or timeline.
2. That a famous person became successful because of grit and hard work, without accounting for dozens of other factors like parental involvement, peer pressure, the challenges of competition, educational opportunities, privilege, mentoring or coaching, and even luck.
3. That someone has a problem (such as criminal behavior, alcoholism, or drug abuse) due to class or race, rather than adverse childhood experiences, discrimination, disability, or some other factors that are complicated.

== See also ==
- Divine providence
- Fate
- Historical fallacy
- Inevitability
- Post hoc ergo propter hoc
- Providentia
