= T. Edward Damer =

American philosopher (1937–2024)

T. Edward "Ed" Damer (August 16, 1937 - March 21, 2024) was an American philosopher, author, father, and grandfather.

== Biography ==
Damer was a professor of philosophy and chair of the Division Visual and Performing Arts at Emory and Henry College in Emory, Virginia. He started on the Emory faculty in 1967 and retired in 2012. In 1991, he won the James A. David Faculty Recognition Award from the Emory alumni in recognition of his teaching.

== Works ==
He is the author of Attacking Faulty Reasoning, a textbook on logical fallacies. The book defines and explains 60 of the most commonly committed fallacies. It also gives specific suggestions about how to address or to "attack" each fallacy when it is encountered. The organization of the fallacies comes from the author's own theories that have accumulated through years of research and study, which defines a fallacy as a violation of one of the five criteria of a good argument.

== See also ==
- Argumentation
