= Name-dropping =

Practice of mentioning famous people

Name-dropping (or name-checking) is the practice of naming or alluding to important people or institutions in order to indicate one's association with them. The term often connotes an attempt to impress others; it is usually regarded negatively, and under certain circumstances may constitute a breach of professional ethics. It may be done within a conversation, a story, a song, an online identity, or other communication.

When used as part of a logical argument it can be an example of the false authority fallacy.

== Purposes ==
Name-dropping is used to position oneself within a social hierarchy. It is often used to create a sense of superiority by raising one's status. By implying (or directly asserting) a connection to people of high status, the name-dropper hopes to raise their own social status to a level closer to that of those whose names they have dropped, and thus elevate themselves above, or into, present company.

Name-dropping can also be used to identify people with a common bond. By indicating the names of people one knows, one makes known their social circle, providing an opportunity for others with similar connections to relate.

As a form of appeal to authority, name-dropping can be an important form of informal argumentation, as long as the name being dropped is of someone who is an expert on the subject of the argument and that person's views are accurately represented.

== Methods ==
Use of the first name may be effective, as in the case of "Kingsley" for Kingsley Amis.

Name-dropping is also sometimes used in works of fiction to place a story in a certain historical timeframe, or to imply the involvement of a historical figure in the action (for example, in a story set during World War II, mentioning Adolf Hitler or Winston Churchill).

== See also ==
- Homage
- No true Scotsman
- Nouveau riche
- Social climbing
