= False equivalence =

Logical fallacy of inconsistency

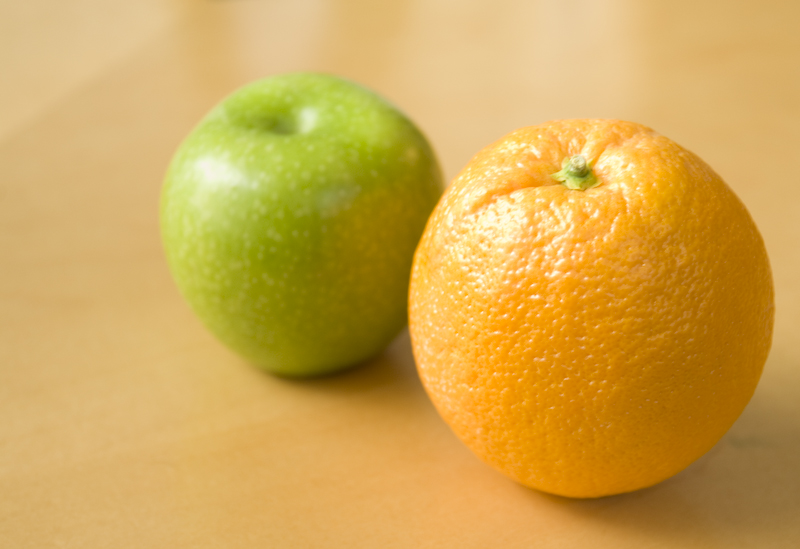
Apples and oranges are both similar-sized seeded, round fruits that grow on trees, but that does not make the two interchangeable.

A false equivalence or false equivalency is an informal fallacy in which an equivalence is drawn between two subjects based on flawed, faulty, or false reasoning. This fallacy is categorized as a fallacy of inconsistency. Colloquially, a false equivalence is often called "comparing apples and oranges."

== Characteristics ==
This fallacy is committed when one shared trait between two subjects is assumed to show equivalence, especially in order of magnitude, when equivalence is not necessarily the logical result. False equivalence is a common result when an anecdotal similarity is pointed out as equal, but the claim of equivalence does not bear scrutiny because the similarity is based on oversimplification or ignorance of additional factors. The pattern of the fallacy is often as such:

If A is the set containing c and d, and B is the set containing d and e then, since they both contain d, A and B are equal.

In an even more fallacious version, d is not required to exist in both sets, merely a similarity of two items d_{1} in set A and d_{2} in set B is cited to assert equivalence among the sets.

Example:

If apples and oranges are both fruits, and there are seeds in both apples and oranges, then since they both contain seeds, apples and oranges are equal.

== Examples ==
Orders of magnitude

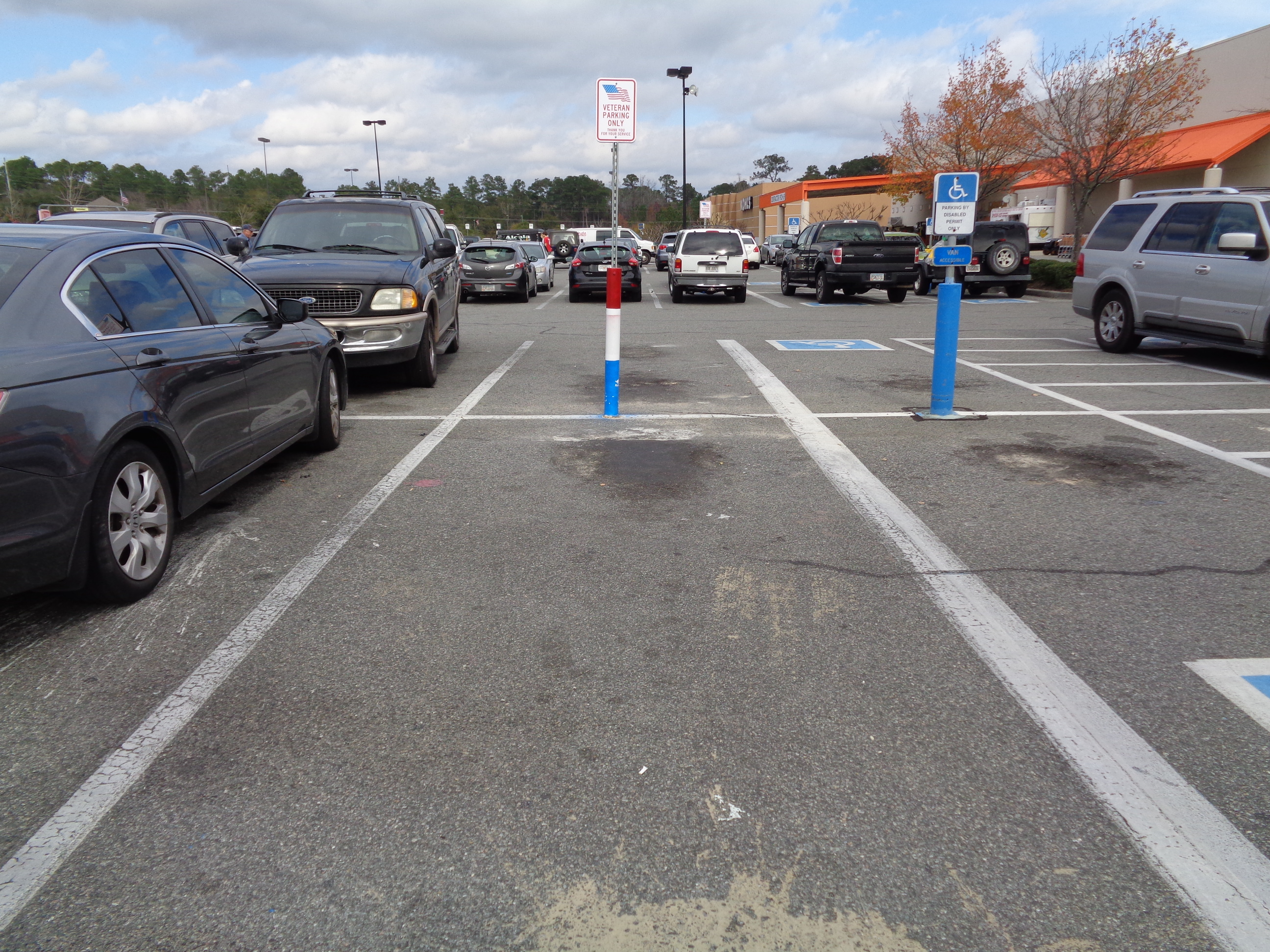
Oil stain

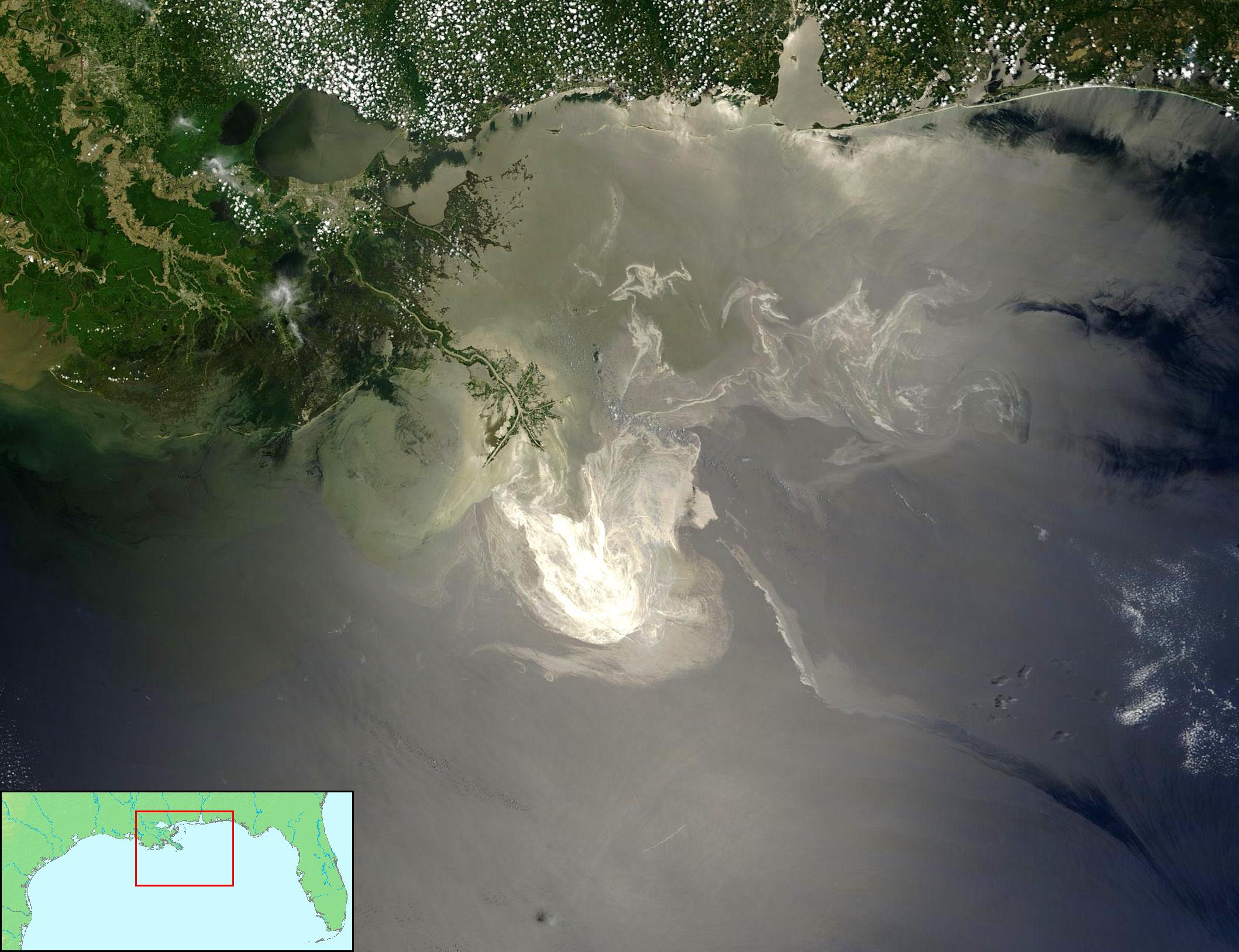
Oil spill

The following statements are examples of false equivalence:

"The Deepwater Horizon oil spill is no more harmful than when your neighbor drips some oil on the ground when changing his car's oil."
The "false equivalence" is the comparison between things differing by many orders of magnitude: Deepwater Horizon spilled 210 million US gal (790 million L) of oil; one's neighbor might spill perhaps 1 US pt (0.47 L).
"They are both Felidae, mammals in the order Carnivora, therefore there's little difference between having a pet cat and a pet jaguar."
The "false equivalence" is in an oversimplification of the factors that make an animal a suitable pet.
"Consuming marijuana can lead to consuming and acquiring a psychological dependence on heroin later in life by acting as a gateway drug, so taking marijuana is like taking heroin."
The "false equivalence" is not considering the difference in likelihood. Consuming heroin is more likely to lead to future heroin dependence than taking marijuana, even given the assumption that one who begins using marijuana is more likely at some later time to try heroin, than someone who has never used marijuana.

== Negative consequence ==
False equivalence arguments are often used in journalism and in politics, where flaws of one politician may be compared to flaws of a wholly different nature of another.

Thomas Patterson of the Shorenstein Center on Media, Politics and Public Policy at Harvard University wrote about the false equivalency used by the media during the 2016 United States presidential election:

False equivalencies are developing on a grand scale as a result of relentlessly negative news. If everything and everyone is portrayed negatively, there's a leveling effect that opens the door to charlatans. The press historically has helped citizens recognize the difference between the earnest politician and the pretender. Today's news coverage blurs the distinction.

== See also ==
- Ad hominem
- Affirming the consequent
- Apophenia
- Equivocation
- False balance
- False analogy
- List of fallacies
- Tu quoque
- Whataboutism
- Wronger than wrong
