= Argument from incredulity =

Informal logical fallacy

Argument from incredulity, also known as argument from personal incredulity, appeal to common sense, or the divine fallacy, is a fallacy in informal logic. It asserts that a proposition must be false because it contradicts one's personal expectations or beliefs, or is difficult to imagine.

Arguments from incredulity can take the form:

1. I cannot imagine how P could be true; therefore P must be false.
2. I cannot imagine how P could be false; therefore P must be true.

Arguments from incredulity can sometimes arise from inappropriate emotional involvement, the conflation of fantasy and reality, a lack of understanding, or an instinctive 'gut' reaction, especially where time is scarce. They are also frequently used to argue that something must be supernatural in origin. This form of reasoning is fallacious because one's inability to imagine how a statement can be true or false gives no information about whether the statement is true or false in reality.

== See also ==
- Disconfirmation bias
- Hanlon's razor
