= Incomplete comparison =

Informal fallacy

An incomplete comparison is a misleading argument popular in advertising. For example, an advertiser might say "product X is better". This is an incomplete assertion, so it can not be refuted. A complete assertion, such as "product X sells for a lower price than product Y" or "the new product X lasts longer than the old product X" could be tested and possibly refuted.

In grammar, an incomplete comparison is a comparison that leaves out one of the items being compared. Unacceptable: Learning Chinese is more difficult. [More difficult than what?]. Acceptable: Learning Chinese is more difficult than learning Spanish.

== See also ==
- Fallacy
- False advertising § Incomplete comparison
