= Argument from authority =

Logical fallacy

An argument from authority (Latin: argumentum ab auctoritate, also called an appeal to authority, or argumentum ad verecundiam) is a form of argument in which the opinion of an authority figure (or figures) is used as evidence to support an argument. While most sources agree this is not a valid form of logical proof and therefore obtaining knowledge in this way is fallible, there is disagreement on the general extent to which it is fallible. Historically, opinion on the appeal to authority has been divided: it is listed as a non-fallacious argument as often as a fallacious argument in various sources.

Some consider it a practical and sound way of obtaining knowledge that is generally likely to be correct when the authority is real, pertinent, and universally accepted, while others consider it to be a very weak defeasible argument or an outright fallacy.

== Forms ==
=== Deductive ===
This argument is a form of genetic fallacy, in which the conclusion about the validity of a statement is justified by appealing to the characteristics of the person who is speaking, such as in the ad hominem fallacy. For this argument, Locke coined the term argumentum ad verecundiam (appeal to shamefacedness/modesty) because it appeals to the fear of humiliation by appearing disrespectful to a particular authority.

This qualification as a logical fallacy implies that this argument is invalid when using the deductive method, and therefore it cannot be presented as infallible. In other words, it is logically invalid to prove a claim is true simply because an authority has said it. The explanation is: authorities can be wrong, and the only way of logically proving a claim is providing real evidence or a valid logical deduction of the claim from the evidence.

=== Inductive ===
When used in the inductive method, which implies the conclusions can not be proven with certainty, the argument can be considered an inductive argument. The general form of this type of argument is:

Person(s) A claims that X is true.
Person(s) A is an expert in the field concerning X.
Therefore, X should be believed.

Inductively it can be used in a cogent form if all sides of a discussion agree on the reliability of the cited authority in the given context.

==== Related logical fallacies ====
It is also a fallacious ad hominem argument to argue that a person presenting statements lacks authority and thus their arguments do not need to be considered. Other related fallacious arguments assume that a person without status or authority is inherently reliable. For instance, the appeal to poverty is the fallacy of thinking that someone is more likely to be correct because they are poor. When an argument holds that a conclusion is likely to be true precisely because the one who holds or is presenting it lacks authority, it is an "appeal to the common man".

When the source of the claim is a false authority, such as when the supposed authority is not a real expert, or when supporting a claim outside of their area of expertise, this is referred to as an "argument from false authority".

== Use in science ==
Scientific knowledge is best established by evidence and experiment rather than argued through authority as authority has no place in science. Carl Sagan wrote of arguments from authority: "One of the great commandments of science is, 'Mistrust arguments from authority.' ... Too many such arguments have proved too painfully wrong. Authorities must prove their contentions like everybody else."

One example of the use of the appeal to authority in science dates to 1923, when leading American zoologist Theophilus Painter declared, based on poor data and conflicting observations he had made, that humans had 24 pairs of chromosomes. From the 1920s until 1956, scientists propagated this "fact" based on Painter's authority, despite subsequent counts totaling the correct number of 23. Even textbooks with photos showing 23 pairs incorrectly declared the number to be 24 based on the authority of the then-consensus of 24 pairs. This seemingly established number generated confirmation bias among researchers, and "most cytologists, expecting to detect Painter's number, virtually always did so". Painter's "influence was so great that many scientists preferred to believe his count over the actual evidence", and scientists who obtained the accurate number modified or discarded their data to agree with Painter's count.

== Roots in cognitive bias ==
Arguments from authority that are based on the idea that a person should conform to the opinion of a perceived authority or authoritative group are rooted in psychological cognitive biases such as the Asch effect. In repeated and modified instances of the Asch conformity experiments, it was found that high-status individuals create a stronger likelihood of a subject agreeing with an obviously false conclusion, despite the subject normally being able to clearly see that the answer was incorrect.

Further, humans have been shown to feel strong emotional pressure to conform to authorities and majority positions. A repeat of the experiments by another group of researchers found that "Participants reported considerable distress under the group pressure", with 59% conforming at least once and agreeing with the clearly incorrect answer, whereas the incorrect answer was much more rarely given when no such pressures were present.

Another study shining light on the psychological basis of the fallacy as it relates to perceived authorities are the Milgram experiments, which demonstrated that people are more likely to go along with something when it is presented by an authority. In a variation of a study where the researchers did not wear lab coats, thus reducing the perceived authority of the tasker, the obedience level dropped to 20% from the original rate, which had been higher than 50%. Obedience is encouraged by reminding the individual of what a perceived authority states and by showing them that their opinion goes against this authority.

Scholars have noted that certain environments can produce an ideal situation for these processes to take hold, giving rise to groupthink. In groupthink, individuals in a group feel inclined to minimize conflict and encourage conformity. Through an appeal to authority, a group member might present that opinion as a consensus and encourage the other group members to engage in groupthink by not disagreeing with this perceived consensus or authority. One paper about the philosophy of mathematics states that, within academia,

If...a person accepts our discipline, and goes through two or three years of graduate study in mathematics, he absorbs our way of thinking, and is no longer the critical outsider he once was...If the student is unable to absorb our way of thinking, we flunk him out, of course. If he gets through our obstacle course and then decides that our arguments are unclear or incorrect, we dismiss him as a crank, crackpot, or misfit.

Corporate environments are similarly vulnerable to appeals to perceived authorities and experts leading to groupthink, as are governments and militaries.

== See also ==
- Authority bias
- Credentialism
- Ipse dixit
- Manifesto of the Ninety-Three
- Name-dropping
- Nobel disease
- Philosophy of testimony
