= Appeal to accomplishment =

Informal fallacy

Appeal to accomplishment is a logical fallacy wherein Person A challenges a thesis put forward by Person B because Person B has not accomplished similar feats (or as many feats) as Person C or Person A.

The reverse, appealing to the fact that no one has the proper experience in question and thus cannot prove something is impossible, is a version of an argument from silence.

Appeal to accomplishment is a form of appeal to authority, which is a well-known logical fallacy. Some consider that it can be used in a cogent form when all sides of a discussion agree on the reliability of the authority in the given context.

== Examples ==
- "How dare you criticize the prime minister? What do you know about running an entire country?"
- "I'll take your opinions on music seriously when you've released a record that went platinum."
- "Get back to me when you've built up a multi-billion dollar empire of your own. Until then, shut up."
- "If you think you know so much about making a video game, make one yourself!"
- "If you think you know so much about making a Street Mod car, make one yourself!"
- "Who are you to criticize a professional athlete? Have you ever played in a professional sports league?"
