= Association fallacy =

Formal fallacy

The association fallacy is a formal fallacy in which it is assumed that, if a concept, whether physical or abstract, has certain properties, any other concept belonging to the same group as the first must also share these properties.

When it is an attempt to win favor by exploiting the audience's preexisting spite or disdain for something else, it is called guilt by association or an appeal to spite (Latin: argumentum ad odium). Guilt by association can be a component of ad hominem arguments which attack the speaker rather than addressing the claims, but they are a distinct class of fallacious argument, and both are able to exist independently of the other.

== Set theory ==
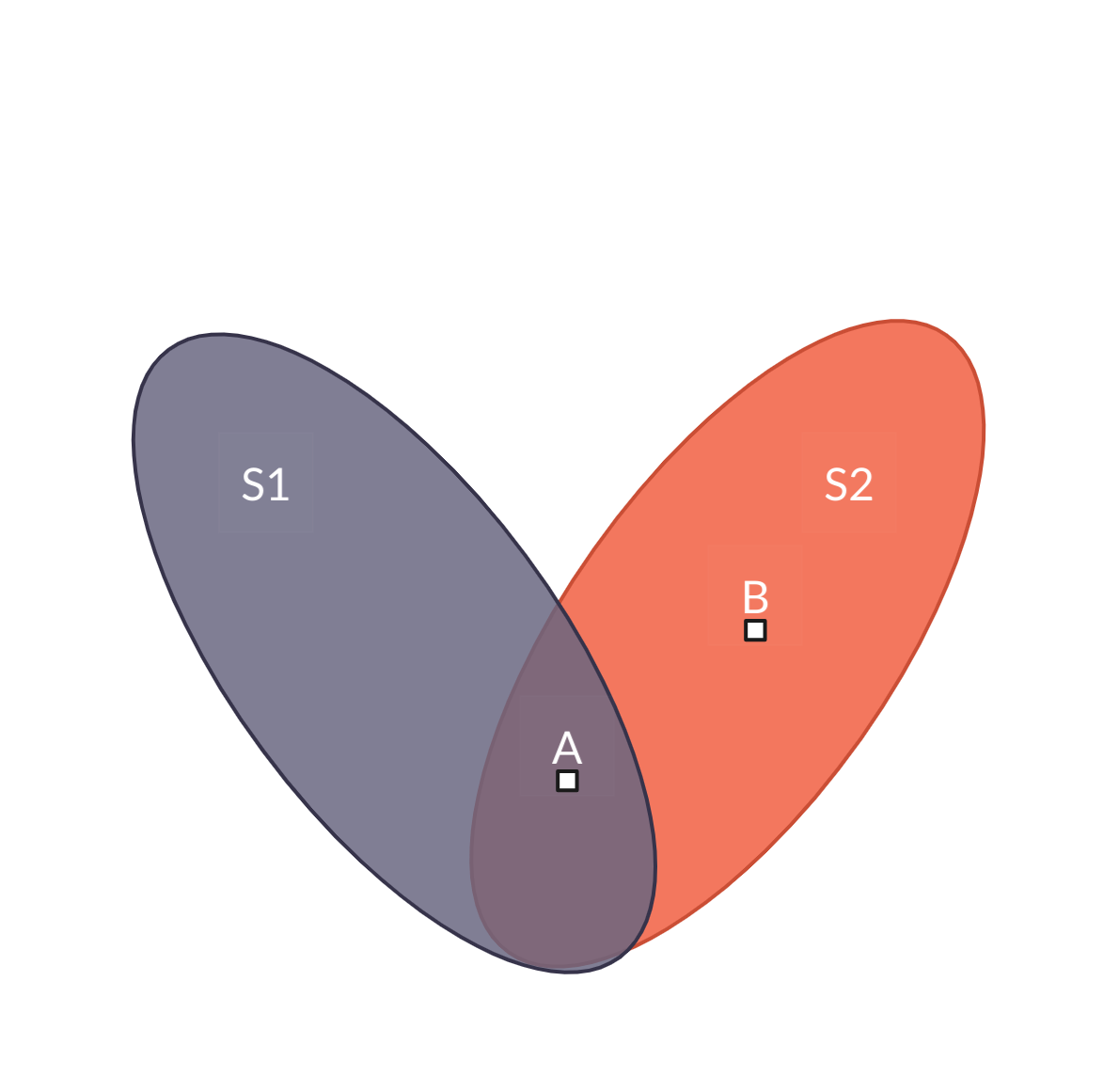
An Euler diagram illustrating the association fallacy

Using set theory, the association fallacy may be written as follows:

Premise
A is in set S1
Premise
A is in set S2
Premise
B is also in set S2
Conclusion
Therefore, B is in set S1.

Using first-order logic, this fallacy may be expressed as$(S_1(A)\and S_2(A)\and S_2(B)) \rightarrow S_1(B)$.

The fallacy in the argument can be illustrated through the use of an Euler diagram: A satisfies the requirement that it is part of both sets S1 and S2, but representing this as an Euler diagram makes it clear that B could be in S2 but not S1.

== Guilt by association ==
This form of the argument is as follows:

- Group A makes a particular claim.
- Group B, which is currently viewed negatively by some, makes the same claim as Group A.
- Therefore, Group A is viewed as associated with Group B, and is now also viewed negatively.

An example of this fallacy would be "My opponent for office just received an endorsement from the Puppy Haters Association. Is that the sort of person you would want to vote for?"

=== Examples ===
Some syllogistic examples of guilt by association:

- John is a con artist. John has black hair. Therefore, people with black hair are necessarily con artists.
- Lyle is a crooked salesman. Lyle proposes a monorail. Therefore, the proposed monorail is necessarily a folly.
- Country X is a dangerous country. Country X has a national postal service. Therefore, countries with national postal services are necessarily dangerous.
- Simon and Karl live in Nashville, and they are both petty criminals. Jill lives in Nashville; therefore, Jill is necessarily a petty criminal.

Guilt by association can sometimes also be a type of ad hominem, if the argument attacks a person because of the similarity between the views of someone making an argument and other proponents of the argument.

== Variations ==
A form of the association fallacy often used by those denying a well-established scientific or historical proposition is the so-called Galileo gambit or Galileo fallacy. The argument runs thus: Galileo was ridiculed in his time for his scientific observations, but was later acknowledged to be right; the proponent argues that since their non-mainstream views are provoking ridicule and rejection from other scientists, they will later be recognized as correct, like Galileo. The gambit is flawed in that being ridiculed does not necessarily correlate with being right and that many people who have been ridiculed in history were, in fact, wrong. Similarly, Carl Sagan noted that people laughed at such geniuses as Christopher Columbus (Note: The idea that Columbus proved that the Earth is spherical to his contemporaries is a historical misconception; see Myth of the flat Earth.) and the Wright brothers, but "they also laughed at Bozo the Clown".

== See also ==
- Common purpose – Criminal joint enterprise
- Discrimination – Prejudicial treatment based on membership in a certain group
- Fallacy of composition – Fallacy of inferring on the whole from a part
- Genetic fallacy – Fallacy where validity is determined by origin
- Jumping to conclusions – Psychological term
- Motte-and-bailey fallacy – Type of informal fallacy
- Nine familial exterminations – Capital punishment in premodern East Asia
- Prejudice – Attitudes based on preconceived categories
- Presumption of guilt – Presumption that a person is guilty of a crime
- Propaganda techniques – Methods of mind manipulation, often based on logical fallacies
- Reductio ad Hitlerum – Logical fallacy in which the argument being attacked is likened to Nazi-era policies
- Scapegoating – Practice of singling out any party for undeserved negative treatment or blame
- Sippenhaft – German term for shared family responsibility
- Social stigma – Type of discrimination or disapproval
- Stereotype – Generalized belief about people
