= Poisoning the well =

Type of informal fallacy

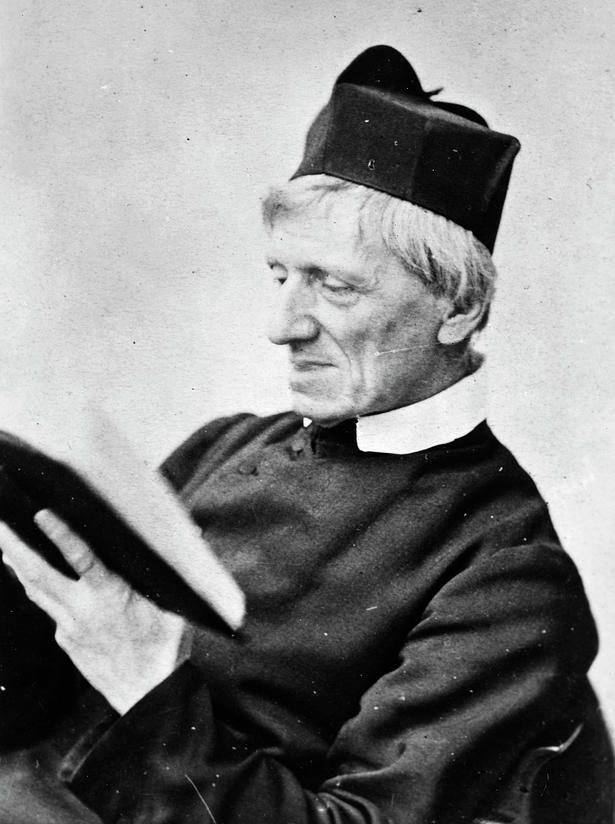
Catholic academic John Henry Newman, who first coined the term in Apologia Pro Vita Sua (1864)

Poisoning the well (or attempting to poison the well) is a type of informal fallacy where adverse information about a target is preemptively presented to an audience, with the intention of discrediting or ridiculing something that the target person is about to say. Poisoning the well can be a special case of argumentum ad hominem, and the term was first used in this sense by Catholic philosopher and Doctor of the Church John Henry Newman in his work Apologia Pro Vita Sua (1864).

== Structure ==
Poisoning the well can take the form of an (explicit or implied) argument, and is considered by some philosophers an informal fallacy.

A poisoned-well "argument" has the following form:

1. Unfavorable information (be it true or false) about person A is presented by another. Example: "Before you listen to my opponent, may I remind you that he has been in jail."
2. Therefore, the claims made by person A will be false.

Poisoned-well arguments are sometimes used with preemptive invocations of the association fallacy. In this pattern, an unfavorable attribute is ascribed to any future opponents, in an attempt to discourage debate. For example, "That's my stance on funding the public education system, and anyone who disagrees with me hates children." Any person who steps forward to dispute the claim will then risk applying the tag to themselves in the process. This is a false dilemma: not all future opponents necessarily have the unfavorable attribute. For example, not everyone who has a different opinion on funding the public education system necessarily hates children.

A poisoned-well "argument" can also be in this form:

1. Unfavorable definitions (be it true or false) that prevent disagreement (or enforce affirmative position).
2. Any claims without first agreeing with the above definitions are automatically dismissed.

Example: "Boss, you heard my side of the story, and why I think Bill should be fired and not me. Now, I am sure Bill is going to come to you with some pathetic attempt to weasel out of this lie that he has created."

== See also ==
- Appeal to ridicule
- Black propaganda
- Dog whistle (politics)
- Framing (social sciences)
- Fruit of the poisonous tree
- Guilt by association
- Procatalepsis
