= Package-deal fallacy =

Logical fallacy

The package-deal fallacy (also known as false conjunction) is the logical fallacy of assuming that things often grouped together by tradition or culture must always be grouped that way. False conjunction refers to misuse of the and operator.

It is particularly common in political arguments, such as the following imagined example from the United States: "My opponent is a conservative who voted against higher taxes and welfare, therefore he will also oppose gun control and abortion." While those four positions are often grouped together as "conservative" in United States politics, a person may believe in one "conservative" idea while not believing in another.

== Additional examples ==
- "John likes surprises, so he'll enjoy finding a snake in his sleeping bag."

Assumes a surprise is inherently a good thing and does not consider the actual context of the event.

- "Droughts are common during summers in Country X, so water is hard to find there in August."

It hasn't rained in Country X for a while, but there may well be plenty of water reserves available. Also, seasons are different between the two hemispheres; if Country X is in the southern hemisphere, August will be in winter. Lastly, just because droughts are common in summer in country X does not mean they must occur every summer. That August may have been one of the summers a drought did not occur.

- "A child molester was caught in a nearby neighborhood. He was friends with many of his neighbors. Everyone in that whole neighborhood is sick."

Assumes that the neighbors knew that their friend was a sex offender and implies their endorsement of such activity. Assumes guilt by association under incidental circumstances.

== When it is not a fallacy ==
The package-deal argument does not need to be a fallacy when used to argue that things grouped by culture and tradition are likely to be grouped in a given way.

=== Examples ===
- "John enjoys science fiction films, so chances are he'll enjoy Star Wars."

While it is not guaranteed that John will like Star Wars, we can tell from information about him that he probably will.

- "There has been a serious drought in Country X for a while, and it is not very developed, so many of its inhabitants are probably starving."

Most developing countries do face famine when drought occurs, so it is likely that this is the case in Country X, even if it is not guaranteed.

== Alternative interpretation ==
Philosopher Ayn Rand used the term to describe a different fallacy in which essentially different concepts or ideas are “packaged” together and treated as though they are essentially similar.

=== Definition ===
Rand wrote: "'Package-dealing' is the fallacy of failing to discriminate crucial differences. It consists of treating together, as parts of a single conceptual whole or 'package,' elements which differ essentially in nature, truth-status, importance, or value."

It is important to stress that the package deal fallacy concerns solely those errors of reasoning which mistreat the essential characteristics of concepts.

=== Examples ===
==== Selfishness and Self-Interest ====
Rand pointed out that, in popular usage, the term selfishness constitutes a package deal because it’s used as a moral evaluation, even though no such evaluation is contained or implied in the word’s meaning:

The meaning ascribed in popular usage to the word “selfishness” is not merely wrong: it represents a devastating intellectual “package-deal,” which is responsible, more than any other single factor, for the arrested moral development of mankind.

In popular usage, the word “selfishness” is a synonym of evil; the image it conjures is of a murderous brute who tramples over piles of corpses to achieve his own ends, who cares for no living being and pursues nothing but the gratification of the mindless whims of any immediate moment.

Yet the exact meaning and dictionary definition of the word “selfishness” is: concern with one’s own interests.

This concept does not include a moral evaluation; it does not tell us whether concern with one’s own interests is good or evil; nor does it tell us what constitutes man’s actual interests. It is the task of ethics to answer such questions. . . .

There is a fundamental moral difference between a man who sees his self-interest in production and a man who sees it in robbery. The evil of a robber does not lie in the fact that he pursues his own interests, but in what he regards as to his own interest; not in the fact that he pursues his values, but in what he chose to value; not in the fact that he wants to live, but in the fact that he wants to live on a subhuman level.

Some modern dictionaries define selfishness and/or self-interest in line with popular usage. Merriam-Webster lists this definition of the former: “the quality or state of being selfish; a concern for one’s own welfare or advantage at the expense of or in disregard of others.” Rand pointed out that this definition is self-contradictory because true concern for one’s own welfare (a state of genuine wellbeing) requires mutually beneficial relationships with others and so precludes unfair treatment or disregard of them:

When one speaks of man’s right to exist for his own sake, for his own rational self-interest, most people assume automatically that this means his right to sacrifice others. Such an assumption is a confession of their own belief that to injure, enslave, rob or murder others is in man’s self-interest—which he must selflessly renounce. The idea that man’s self-interest can be served only by a non-sacrificial relationship with others has never occurred to those humanitarian apostles of unselfishness, who proclaim their desire to achieve the brotherhood of men. And it will not occur to them, or to anyone, so long as the concept “rational” is omitted from the context of “values,” “desires,” “self-interest” and ethics.

==== Altruism ====
Rand also identified altruism as a package deal when it is regarded as synonymous with or integral to morality:

There are two moral questions which altruism lumps together into one “package-deal”: (1) What are values? (2) Who should be the beneficiary of values? Altruism substitutes the second for the first; it evades the task of defining a code of moral values, thus leaving man, in fact, without moral guidance. Altruism declares that any action taken for the benefit of others is good, and any action taken for one’s own benefit is evil. Thus the beneficiary of an action is the only criterion of moral value—and so long as that beneficiary is anybody other than oneself, anything goes.

Identifying behaviors and double standards common in virtually all modern societies, Rand offered the following examples of ways in which the beneficiary of an action is often used as a standard of moral judgment:

Why is it moral to serve the happiness of others, but not your own? If enjoyment is a value, why is it moral when experienced by others, but immoral when experienced by you? If the sensation of eating a cake is a value, why is it an immoral indulgence in your stomach, but a moral goal for you to achieve in the stomach of others? Why is it immoral for you to desire, but moral for others to do so? Why is it immoral to produce a value and keep it, but moral to give it away? And if it is not moral for you to keep a value, why is it moral for others to accept it? If you are selfless and virtuous when you give it, are they not selfish and vicious when they take it? Does virtue consist of serving vice?

==== Power ====
Many people conflate political power and economic power, which are wholly different concepts.

Political power is the ability to legally employ or threaten physical force against others, typically via legislation, regulation, or taxation. Possible penalties for noncompliance, such as fines, arrest, and imprisonment, are ultimately backed by a threat of physical force.

Economic power, by contrast, is characterized primarily by the absence of physical force; buyers and sellers exchange goods and services voluntarily or not at all. Lumping together economic and political power under the broader concept “power” while ignoring the crucial differences between them constitutes a package deal.

== See also ==
- List of fallacies
- Critical thinking
- Psychology of reasoning
- Availability heuristic
- Illusory correlation
- Stereotyping
