= Genetic fallacy =

Fallacy where validity is determined by origin

The genetic fallacy (also known as the fallacy of origins or fallacy of virtue) is a fallacy of irrelevance in which arguments or information are dismissed or validated based solely on their source or origin rather than their content. In other words, a claim is ignored or given credibility based on its source rather than the claim itself.

The fallacy therefore fails to assess the claim on its merit. The first criterion of a good argument is that the premises must have bearing on the truth or falsity of the claim in question. Genetic accounts of an issue may be true and may help illuminate the reasons why the issue has assumed its present form, but they are not conclusive in determining its merits.

In The Oxford Companion to Philosophy (1995), it is asserted that the term originated in Morris Raphael Cohen and Ernest Nagel's book Logic and Scientific Method (1934). However, in a book review published in The Nation in 1926, Mortimer J. Adler complained that The Story of Philosophy by Will Durant was guilty throughout of "the fallacy of genetic interpretation." Adler characterized the genetic fallacy generally as "the substitution of psychology for logic."

== Examples ==
From Attacking Faulty Reasoning by T. Edward Damer, Third Edition p. 36:

You're not going to wear a wedding ring, are you? Don't you know that the wedding ring originally symbolized ankle chains worn by women to prevent them from running away from their husbands? I would not have thought you would be a party to such a sexist practice.

There are numerous motives explaining why people choose to wear wedding rings, but it would be a fallacy to presume those who continue the tradition are promoting sexism.

Another example would be from How to Win Every Argument: The Use and Abuse of Logic (2006) by Madsen Pirie, p. 82:

The objections of the Council's new bus timetable come only from private property developers, and can be ignored.

As the author points out, private developers may well have legitimate and knowledgeable opinions on such a matter.

There is a debate about the genetic fallacy in relation to Thomas Kuhn's historicist philosophy of science as set out in his 1962 book The Structure of Scientific Revolutions.

== See also ==
- Ad hominem – Attacking the person rather than the argument
- Appeal to accomplishment – Informal fallacy
- Appeal to nature – Rhetorical tactic and potential fallacy
- Appeal to novelty – The argument that a newer idea is superior
  - Chronological snobbery – The argument that an older idea is inferior
- Appeal to tradition – Logical fallacy in which a thesis is deemed correct on the basis of tradition – The argument that an older idea is superior
- Argument from authority – Logical fallacy
- Association fallacy – Formal fallacy
- Bulverism – Type of logical fallacy
- Etymological fallacy – An assertion that the historical meaning of the word is its only true meaning
- "Not invented here" – A dismissal of "foreign" ideas because they did not originate from the speaker's country, social group, or organization
- Reactive devaluation – Cognitive bias
