= Noah S. Sweat =

American judge and law professor (1922–1996)

Member of the Mississippi House of Representatives
- In office 1947–1949

Personal details
- Born: Noah S. Sweat Jr. October 2, 1922
- Died: February 23, 1996 (aged 73) Alcorn County, Mississippi, US
- Occupation: Judge; law professor
- Known for: If-by-whiskey speech

Noah S. "Soggy" Sweat Jr. (October 2, 1922 – February 23, 1996) was an American judge, law professor, and state representative in Mississippi, notable for his 1952 speech on the floor of the Mississippi state legislature concerning whiskey. Reportedly the speech took Sweat two and a half months to write. The speech is renowned for the grand rhetorical terms in which it seems to come down firmly and decisively on both sides of the question while taking a moderate stance. The speech gave rise to the phrase if-by-whiskey.

== Career ==
Sweat was elected to the Mississippi House in 1947, at the age of 24. He served only one five-year term, at the end of which he delivered his speech.

He subsequently pursued his career in law. Sweat was the founder of the Mississippi Judicial College of the University of Mississippi Law Center. The writer John Grisham worked as his assistant as a law student in 1980.

According to William Safire, Sweat's nickname was derived from the phrase "sorghum top", a reference to the way in which his hair resembled a sugar cane tassel.

He died in 1996 in Alcorn County, Mississippi, after a long battle with Parkinson's disease.

== The "whiskey speech" ==
The "whiskey speech", delivered on Friday, April 4, 1952, concerned the question of the prohibition of alcoholic liquor, a law that was still in force in Mississippi at the time the speech was delivered.

My friends, I had not intended to discuss this controversial subject at this particular time. However, I want you to know that I do not shun controversy. On the contrary, I will take a stand on any issue at any time, regardless of how fraught with controversy it might be. You have asked me how I feel about whiskey. All right, this is how I feel about whiskey:

If when you say whiskey you mean the devil's brew, the poison scourge, the bloody monster, that defiles innocence, dethrones reason, destroys the home, creates misery and poverty, yea, literally takes the bread from the mouths of little children; if you mean the evil drink that topples the Christian man and woman from the pinnacle of righteous, gracious living into the bottomless pit of degradation, and despair, and shame and helplessness, and hopelessness, then certainly I am against it.

But, if when you say whiskey you mean the oil of conversation, the philosophic wine, the ale that is consumed when good fellows get together, that puts a song in their hearts and laughter on their lips, and the warm glow of contentment in their eyes; if you mean Christmas cheer; if you mean the stimulating drink that puts the spring in the old gentleman's step on a frosty, crispy morning; if you mean the drink which enables a man to magnify his joy, and his happiness, and to forget, if only for a little while, life's great tragedies, and heartaches, and sorrows; if you mean that drink, the sale of which pours into our treasuries untold millions of dollars, which are used to provide tender care for our little crippled children, our blind, our deaf, our dumb, our pitiful aged and infirm; to build highways and hospitals and schools, then certainly I am for it.

This is my stand. I will not retreat from it. I will not compromise.

Sweat later recalled: "When I finished the first half of the speech, there was a tremendous burst of applause. The second half of the speech, after the close of which, the wets all applauded. The drys were as unhappy with the second part of the speech as the wets were with the first half."

The speech is a common example of escaping between the horns of a false dilemma, although it has been mistaken as equivocation, such that the phrase if-by-whiskey has often used as shorthand for an argument that equivocates to avoid committing fully to a single position of a controversial issue.
