= Fallacy of four terms =

Formal fallacy that occurs when a syllogism has four (or more) terms

The fallacy of four terms (Latin: quaternio terminorum) is the formal fallacy that occurs when a syllogism has four (or more) terms rather than the requisite three, rendering it invalid.

== Definition ==
Categorical syllogisms always have three terms:

Major premise: Weapons are dangerous.
Minor premise: Knives are weapons.
Conclusion: Knives are dangerous.

Here, the three terms are: "weapon", "dangerous", and "knife".

Using four terms invalidates the syllogism:

Major premise: Weapons are dangerous.
Minor premise: Balloons are round.
Conclusion: Balloons are dangerous.

Notice that there are four terms: "weapon", "dangerous", "balloon", and "round". The two premises do not connect "balloons" with "dangerous", so the reasoning is invalid. Two premises are not enough to connect four different terms, since in order to establish connection, there must be one term common to both premises.

In everyday reasoning, the fallacy of four terms occurs most frequently by equivocation: using the same word or phrase but with a different meaning each time, creating a fourth term even though only three distinct words are used. The resulting argument sounds like the (valid) first example above, but is in fact structured like the invalid second example:

Major premise: Nothing is better than eternal happiness.
Minor premise: A ham sandwich is better than nothing.
Conclusion: A ham sandwich is better than eternal happiness.

The word "nothing" in the example above has two meanings, as presented: "nothing is better" means the thing being named has the highest value possible (there exists nothing better); "better than nothing" means only that the thing being described has some value (more than the implied zero value of nothing). Therefore, "nothing" acts as two different terms in this example, thus creating the fallacy of four terms.

The fallacy of four terms also applies to syllogisms that contain five or six terms.

== Reducing terms ==
Sometimes a syllogism that is apparently fallacious because it is stated with more than three terms can be translated into an equivalent, valid three term syllogism. For example:

Major premise: No humans are immortal.
Minor premise: All Greeks are people.
Conclusion: All Greeks are mortal.

This EAE-1 syllogism apparently has five terms: "humans", "immortal", "Greeks", "people", and "mortal". But it can be rewritten as a standard form AAA-1 syllogism by first substituting the synonymous term "humans" for "people" and then by reducing the complementary term "immortal" in the first premise using the immediate inference known as obversion (that is, the statement "No humans are immortal." is equivalent to the statement "All humans are mortal.").

== Classification ==
The fallacy of four terms is a syllogistic fallacy. Types of syllogism to which it applies include statistical syllogism, hypothetical syllogism, and categorical syllogism, all of which must have exactly three terms. Because it applies to the argument's form, as opposed to the argument's content, it is classified as a formal fallacy.

Equivocation of the middle term is a frequently cited source of a fourth term being added to a syllogism; both of the equivocation examples above affect the middle term of the syllogism. Consequently this common error itself has been given its own name: the fallacy of the ambiguous middle. An argument that commits the ambiguous middle fallacy blurs the line between formal and informal (material) fallacies, however it is usually considered an informal fallacy because the argument's form appears valid.
