= Historical fallacy =

Type of logical fallacy

The historical fallacy is a logical fallacy originally described by philosopher John Dewey in The Psychological Review in 1896. Most simply put, the fallacy occurs when a person believes that results occur only because of the process taken to obtain them. Dewey writes:

"A set of considerations, which hold good only because of a completed process, is read into the content of the process which conditions this completed result. A state of things characterizing an outcome is regarded as a true description of the events which led up to this outcome; when, as a matter of fact, if this outcome had already been in existence, there would have been no necessity for the process."

== Examples ==
- A man loses his wallet but has an idea of where it might be.
- He looks for his wallet and finds it where he thought it may have been.
- The man falsely concludes that he knew where his wallet was the entire time.
- Thus, the man incorrectly concludes that knowing where to look (i.e., the process) was essential to his finding of the wallet (i.e. the result), while another possible scenario may have been that he looked at where he thought his wallet was, but it wasn't there.

== See also ==
List of fallacies
