= Etymological fallacy =

Fallacy in which a word's history defines its meaning

An etymological fallacy is an argument of equivocation, arguing that a word is defined by its etymology, and that its customary usage is therefore incorrect.

== Occurrence and examples ==
An etymological fallacy becomes possible when a word's meaning shifts over time from its original meaning. Such changes can include a narrowing or widening of scope or a change of connotation (amelioration or pejoration). In some cases, modern usage can shift to the point where the new meaning has no evident connection to its etymon.

=== Antisemitism ===
The term antisemitism refers to hostility or prejudice against Jewish people, beliefs, and practices. It replaced the earlier term Jew-hatred. The etymological fallacy arises when a speaker asserts its meaning is the one implied by the structure of the word—racism against any of the Semitic peoples.

== See also ==
- False friends
- Folk etymology – Process of reinterpretive word formation
- Genetic fallacy – Fallacy where validity is determined by origin
- Informal fallacy – Form of incorrect argument in natural language
- Persuasive definition – Stipulative, biased definition of a term
