= Argumentum ad crumenam =

Informal fallacy

An argumentum ad crumenam argument, also known as an argument to the purse, is the informal fallacy of drawing conclusions based on the speaker's financial status. The term generally refers to the assumption that having wealth is indicative of insight or virtue, and that poverty denotes the opposite.

The opposite is the argumentum ad lazarum.

== Examples ==
- "If you're so smart, why aren't you rich?"
- "This new law is a good idea. Most of the people against it are riff-raff who make less than $20,000 a year."
- "Warren Buffett is hosting a seminar. This seminar is better than others, because Warren Buffett is richer than most people."
