= Argumentum ad lazarum =

Informal fallacy linking wisdom to poverty

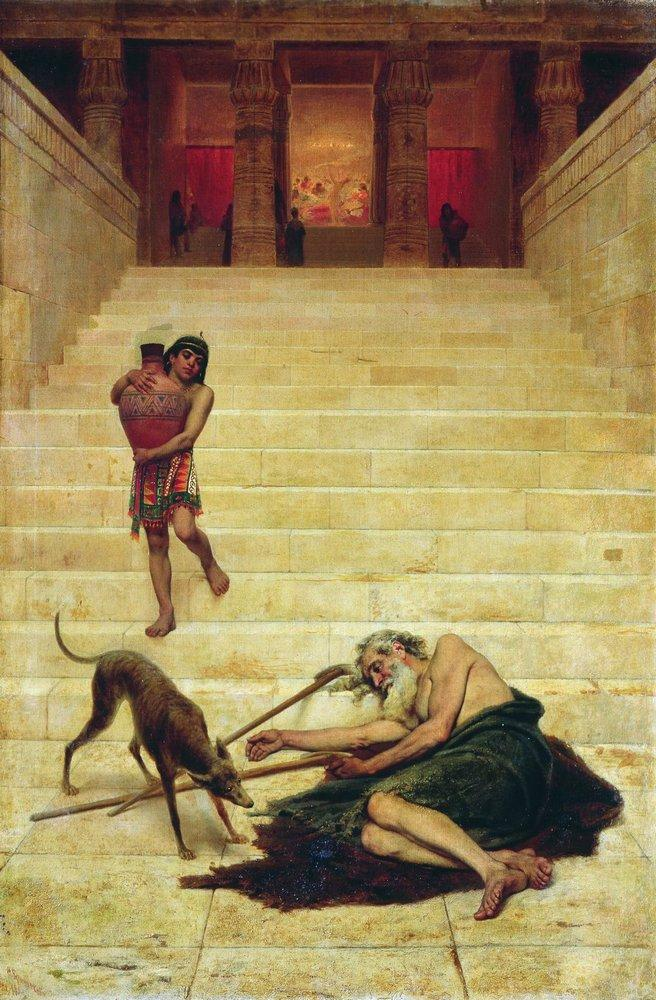
An 1886 painting of Lazarus at the rich man's gate by Fyodor Bronnikov

Argumentum ad lazarum or appeal to poverty is the informal fallacy of thinking a conclusion is correct solely because the speaker is poor, or it is incorrect because the speaker is rich. It is named after Lazarus, a beggar in a New Testament parable who receives his reward in the afterlife. A common summary of the fallacy is "Poor, but honest".

The opposite is the argumentum ad crumenam.

Some experimental evidence supports the appeal to poverty. A 2017 study by Igor Grossmann and Justin Brienza at the University of Waterloo in Canada found that when "wisdom" is defined as the ability to consider opposing perspectives and find a compromise that defuses an interpersonal dispute, poor and working-class people are more likely to show such an ability than are those in higher socioeconomic classes. As with all fallacies though, the tendency is not absolute.

== Examples ==
- "Family farms are struggling to get by so when they say we need to protect them, they must be on to something."
- "The homeless tell us it's hard to find housing. Thus it must be."
- "The monks have forsworn all material possessions. They must have achieved enlightenment."
- "All you need to know about the civil war in that country is that the rebels live in mud huts, while the general who sends troops against them sits in a luxurious, air-conditioned office. Therefore the rebels must be fighting for freedom."
