= Rory Sutherland (advertising executive) =

Advertising executive, published author and speaker

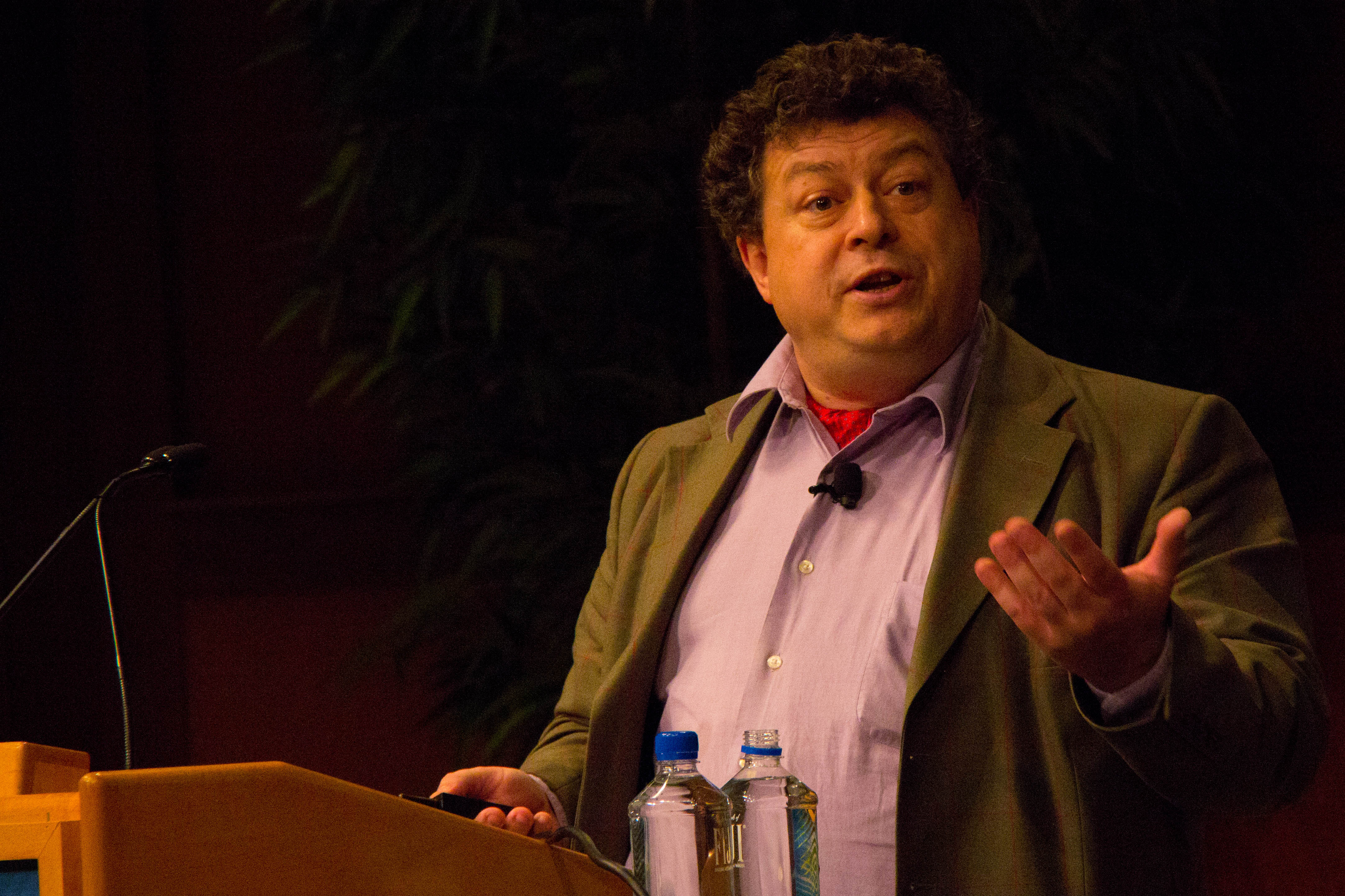
- Sutherland in 2011
- Born: Roderick Henry Sutherland; 12 November 1965 (age 61); Usk, Monmouthshire, Wales
- Education: Christ's College, Cambridge
- Occupations: Advertising executive; copywriter; speaker; author
- Children: 2

Roderick Henry "Rory" Sutherland (born 12 November 1965) is a Welsh advertising executive. He is the President Emeritus of Ogilvy Consulting. Sutherland writes a fortnightly column in The Spectator and has written several books, including Alchemy: The Power of Ideas That Don't Make Sense.

== Early life ==
Rory Sutherland was born in Llanbadoc, near Usk, Monmouthshire, Wales. He attended Monmouth School, a private Haberdashers' school in Monmouthshire, and studied classics at Christ's College, Cambridge, starting in 1984.

== Career ==
Sutherland joined Ogilvy & Mather as a graduate trainee planner in 1988, having been inspired to join the advertising industry by the British television advertising of the 1980s. He worked briefly in account management before switching to copywriting and became the creative director in 2001. Sutherland worked on Ogilvy's American Express and Dove soap accounts.

From 2008 to 2012, Sutherland was president of the Institute of Practitioners in Advertising (IPA). In 2012, Sutherland founded the behavioural science practice within the Ogilvy Group, whose goal is to develop marketing techniques inspired by the fields of psychology and economics, rather than shaping customer desires through conventional advertising.

In 2011 Sutherland published his first book, The Wiki Man, and since publication he has regularly written a column that has the same title in The Spectator magazine.

In 2019 Sutherland published his second book called Alchemy: The Magic of Original Thinking in a World of Mind-Numbing Conformity, in which he argues that great marketing ideas are often built around a core that is profoundly irrational.

In 2021 Sutherland published Transport for Humans: Are we nearly there yet? (co-authored with Department of Transport behavioural scientist Pete Dyson).

Sutherland has been noted for his popularity on TikTok, and described by The Guardian as "one of the most unlikely TikTok sensations of the day." After a fan started uploading clips of Sutherland's talks, interviews and podcast appearances, Sutherland and Ogilvy eventually took over running the account.

== Concepts ==
=== Doorman fallacy ===
In his 2019 book Alchemy, Sutherland coined the term "doorman fallacy". The doorman fallacy refers to the error of reducing a person's job to its most basic function and replacing it with a cost-effective automation while disregarding the broader, not directly visible, value they provide.

The example provided in the book is about a hotel that decides to replace its doorman. One may consider their singular function to be opening and closing the door which is easily replaceable by an automated door. This overlooks the doorman's indirect functions, such as guest-recognition, security and status signalling. Retaining the doorman would signal the hotel's premium status, allowing them to charge more, meaning the potential cost-saving measure might end up costing the hotel more than it saves.

== Personal life ==
Sutherland is married to Sophie Sutherland, a priest at Bromley Parish Church. They have twin daughters.
