= Equivocation =

Misleading use of a term with multiple meanings

In logic, equivocation ("calling two different things by the same name") is an informal fallacy resulting from the failure to define one's terms, or knowingly and deliberately using words in a different sense than the one the audience will understand.

It is a type of ambiguity that stems from a phrase having two or more distinct meanings, not from the grammar or structure of the sentence.

== Fallacy of four terms ==
Equivocation in a syllogism (a chain of reasoning) produces a fallacy of four terms (quaternio terminorum). Below is an example:

Since only man [human] is rational.
And no woman is a man [male].
Therefore, no woman is rational.

The first instance of "man" implies the entire human species, while the second implies just those who are male.

== Motte-and-bailey fallacy ==
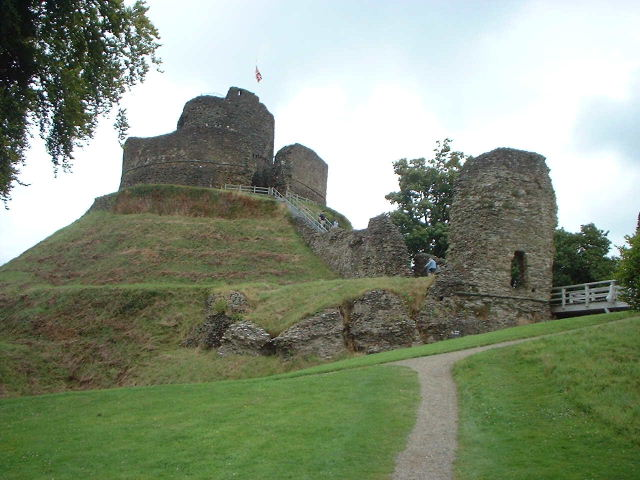
The motte (raised area) and bailey (walled courtyard) defenses at Launceston Castle

Equivocation can also be used to conflate two positions which share similarities, one modest and easy to defend and one much more controversial. The arguer advances the controversial position, but when challenged, they insist that they are only advancing the more modest position.

== See also ==
- Antanaclasis: A related purposeful rhetorical device
- Circumlocution: Phrasing to explain something without saying it
- Equivocality: Organizational information theory
- Etymological fallacy: A kind of linguistic misconception
- Evasion (ethics): Tell the truth while deceiving
- False equivalence: Fallacy based on flawed reasoning
- If-by-whiskey: An example
- Map-territory relation: Concept that words used to describe an underlying reality are arbitrary abstractions not to be confused with the reality itself
- Mental reservation: A doctrine in moral theology
- No true Scotsman: Changing a definition to exclude a counter-example
- Persuasive definition: Skewed definition of term
- Plausible deniability: A blame-shifting technique
- Polysemy: The property of word or phrase having certain type of multiple meanings
- Principle of explosion: One of the fundamental laws in logic
- Syntactic ambiguity, Amphiboly, Amphibology: Ambiguity of a sentence by its grammatical structure
- When a white horse is not a horse: An example
