= Appeal to ridicule =

Type of logical fallacy

Appeal to ridicule (also called appeal to mockery, or the horse laugh) is an informal fallacy which presents an opponent's argument as absurd, ridiculous, or humorous, and therefore not worthy of serious consideration.

== Description ==
Appeal to ridicule is often found in the form of comparing a multi-layered circumstance or argument to a laughably commonplace event or to another irrelevant thing based on comedic timing, or wordplay. This is a rhetorical tactic that mocks an opponent's argument or position, attempting to inspire a strong emotional reaction (making it a type of appeal to emotion) in the audience and to highlight any counter-intuitive aspects of that argument, making it appear foolish and contrary to common sense. This is typically done by mocking the argument's representative foundation in an uncharitable and oversimplified way. The person using the tactic is often sarcastic in their argument.

== Examples ==
This dialogue presents an example of appeal to ridicule:

Person A: At one time in prehistory, the continents were fused together into a single supercontinent, which we call Pangaea.
Person B: Yes, I definitely believe that hundreds of millions of years ago, some laser cut through the Earth and broke apart a giant landmass into many different pieces.

The element of ridicule arises from person B projecting an unstated assumption—that the only means of separating continents would be with a laser—onto the proposition stated by person A.

== See also ==
- Anne Elk's Theory on Brontosauruses
- The Courtier's Reply
- Hitchens's razor
- Mockery
- Reductio ad absurdum
- Straw man (a similar fallacy)
