= Tone policing =

Distraction technique and anti-debate tactic

A tone argument or tone policing is an informal fallacy or rhetorical tactic in which someone focuses on the tone or emotional expression of an argument rather than its factual or logical content (thus called appeal to tone or appeal to confidence when it is the case). Not every criticism of tone is fallacious; it becomes fallacious only when tone, anger, emotional intensity, or perceived emotional intent is treated as a reason to reject an argument's premises, evidence, or conclusion.

== History ==
The notion of tone policing became widespread in U.S. social activist circles by the mid-2010s. It was widely disseminated in a 2015 comic issued by the Everyday Feminism website. Activists have argued that tone policing has been regularly employed against feminist and anti-racism advocates, criticizing the way that their proponents presented their arguments rather than engaging with the arguments themselves.

== Contentions ==
Proponents of this viewpoint contend that these expectations tend to give preference to a specific mode of communication often associated with traits like masculinity, high levels of education, and a detached, "rational" style of expression. They argue that this emphasis on a particular communication style may inadvertently reinforce existing societal inequalities, including those rooted in colonial history, White-supremacist structures, cis-hetero-patriarchy, and capitalist systems.

Tone policing may marginalize individuals who naturally incorporate diverse linguistic features, including frequent use of filler words such as "like" and "um," and employ vocal variety, including vocal fry and uptalk, in their speech. In the realm of social justice, scholars and experts often underscore the significance of emotions, such as anger, as they are frequently associated with personal experiences of injustice and can serve as motivators for those engaged in social change efforts.

The proliferation of social media platforms has contributed to the prevalence of tone policing in online discussions, particularly in contexts characterized by brevity and anonymity. In these digital environments, there is an increased focus on tone over substantive arguments.

== Effects ==
Psychological research has explored the potential effects of tone policing, suggesting that individuals consistently subjected to such policing can experience frustration, feelings of silencing, and self-doubt. This psychological toll can significantly deter individuals from actively participating in conversations pertaining to social justice matters.

Additionally, it is noteworthy that educational institutions can be spaces where tone policing manifests, particularly when students advocate for change or raise concerns about systemic inequalities. This may influence communication norms within academic settings.

== See also ==
- Angry black woman
- Fallacy
- Overconfidence effect
- Ratchet (slang)
- Respectability politics
- Righteous indignation
