= Ad hominem =

Attacking the person rather than their argument

Ad hominem, short for argumentum ad hominem ('argument directed at the person'), is a rhetorical tactic of attacking the character, motive, or some other attribute of the person making an argument rather than the substance of the argument itself. This avoids genuine debate by creating a diversion often using a totally irrelevant, but often highly charged attribute of the opponent's character or background. The most common form of this fallacy is "A" makes a claim of "fact", to which "B" asserts that "A" has a personal trait, quality or physical attribute that is repugnant thereby going off-topic, and hence "B" concludes that "A" has their "fact" wrong – without ever addressing the point of the debate.

Other uses of the term ad hominem are more traditional, referring to arguments tailored to fit a particular audience, and may be encountered in specialized philosophical usage. These typically refer to the dialectical strategy of using the target's own beliefs and arguments against them, while not agreeing with the validity of those beliefs and arguments. Ad hominem arguments were first studied in ancient Greece; John Locke revived the examination of ad hominem arguments in the 17th century. James Madison opposed the use of this argument in the following words:

If according to the noble precept, it be lawful to accept good advice even from an enemy, shall we set the ignoble example of refusing such advice even when it is offered by our friends? The prudent enquiry in all cases, ought surely to be not so much from whom the advice comes, as whether the advice be good

— The Federalist Papers n. 40

A common misconception is that an ad hominem attack is synonymous with an insult. This is not true, although some ad hominem arguments may be considered insulting by the recipient.

== History ==
Aristotle (384–322 BC) is credited with raising the distinction between personal and logical arguments.

The various types of ad hominem arguments have been known in the West since at least the ancient Greeks. Aristotle, in his work Sophistical Refutations, detailed the fallaciousness of putting a person rather than an argument under scrutiny. His description was somewhat different from the modern understanding, referring to a class of sophistry that applies an ambiguously worded question about people to a specific person. ("Can a man see with an eye he doesn't have? Then this two-eyed man cannot see, since he doesn't have one eye.") The proper refutation, he wrote, is not to debate the attributes of the person (solutio ad hominem) but to address the original ambiguity.

Many examples of ancient non-fallacious ad hominem arguments are preserved in the works of the Pyrrhonist philosopher Sextus Empiricus. In these arguments, the concepts and assumptions of the opponents are used as part of a dialectical strategy against them to demonstrate the unsoundness of their own arguments and assumptions. In this way, the arguments are directed at the person, but without attacking the properties of the individuals making the arguments. This kind of argument is also known as "argument from commitment".

Italian Galileo Galilei and British philosopher John Locke also examined the argument from commitment, a form of the ad hominem argument, meaning examining an argument on the basis of whether it stands true to the principles of the person carrying the argument. In the mid-19th century, the modern understanding of the term ad hominem started to take shape, with the broad definition given by English logician Richard Whately. According to Whately, ad hominem arguments were "addressed to the peculiar circumstances, character, avowed opinions, or past conduct of the individual".

Over time, the term acquired a different meaning; by the beginning of the 20th century, it was linked to a logical fallacy, in which a debater, instead of disproving an argument, attacked their opponent. This approach was also popularized in philosophical textbooks of the mid-20th century, and it was challenged by Australian philosopher Charles Leonard Hamblin in the second half of the 20th century. In a detailed work, he suggested that the inclusion of a statement against a person in an argument does not necessarily make it a fallacious argument since that particular phrase is not a premise that leads to a conclusion. While Hamblin's criticism was not widely accepted, Canadian philosopher Douglas N. Walton examined the fallaciousness of the ad hominem argument further. Except in specialized philosophical discourse, contemporary use of the term ad hominem describes a direct attack on the character and ethos of a person, in an attempt to refute their argument.

== Terminology ==
The Latin phrase argumentum ad hominem stands for 'argument against the person'. In this context, ad means 'against', but could also mean 'to' or 'towards'.

The terms ad mulierem and ad feminam have been used specifically when the person receiving the criticism is female but the term hominem (accusative of homo) is gender-neutral in Latin, and merely implies that the recipient of the insult is a human being.

== Ad hominem ==
Fallacious ad hominem reasoning is categorized among informal fallacies, more precisely as a genetic fallacy, a subcategory of fallacies of irrelevance.

Ad hominem fallacies can be separated into various types, such as tu quoque, circumstantial ad hominem, guilt by association, and abusive ad hominem. All of them are similar to the general scheme of ad hominem argument, that is instead of dealing with the essence of someone's argument or trying to refute it, the interlocutor is attacking the character of the proponent of the argument and concluding that it is a sufficient reason to drop the initial argument.

=== Tu quoque ===
Ad hominem tu quoque (literally 'you also') is a response to an ad hominem argument that itself goes ad hominem.

Tu quoque /[tuː koʊ.kweɪ]/ appears as:

- A makes a claim a.
- B attacks the character of A by claiming they hold negative property x.
- A defends themself by attacking B, saying they also hold the same property x.

An example given by professor George Wrisley to illustrate the above is:

A businessman and a politician are giving a lecture at a university about how good his company is and how nicely the system works. A student asks him "Is it true that you and your company are selling weapons to third world rulers who use those arms against their own people?" and the businessman replies "Is it true that your university gets funding by the same company that you are claiming is selling guns to those countries? You are not a white dove either". The student's ad hominem accusation is not fallacious, as it is relevant to the narrative the businessman is trying to project. On the other hand, the businessman's attack on the student (that is, the student being inconsistent) is irrelevant to the opening narrative. So the businessman's tu quoque response is fallacious.

Canadian philosopher Christopher Tindale approaches somewhat different the tu quoque fallacy. According to Tindale, a tu quoque fallacy appears when a response to an argument is made on the history of the arguer. This argument is also invalid because it does not disprove the premise; if the premise is true, then source A may be a hypocrite or even changed their mind, but this does not make the statement less credible from a logical perspective. A common example, given by Tindale, is when a doctor advises a patient to lose weight, but the patient argues that there is no need for him to go on a diet because the doctor is also overweight.

=== Circumstantial ===
Circumstantial ad hominem points out that someone is in circumstances (for instance, their job, wealth, property, or relations) such that they are disposed to take a particular position. It constitutes an attack on the bias of a source. As with other types of the argument, the circumstantial ad hominem could be fallacious or not. It could be fallacious because a disposition to make a certain argument does not make the argument invalid; this overlaps with the genetic fallacy (an argument that a claim is incorrect due to its source). But it also may be a sound argument, if the premises are correct and the bias is relevant to the argument.

A simple example is: a father may tell his daughter not to start smoking because she will damage her health, and she may point out that he is or was a smoker. This does not alter the fact that smoking might cause various diseases. Her father's inconsistency is not a proper reason to reject his claim.

Douglas N. Walton, philosopher and pundit on informal fallacies, argues that a circumstantial ad hominem argument can be non-fallacious. This could be the case when someone (A) attacks the personality of another person (B), making an argument (a) while the personality of B is relevant to argument a, i.e., B talks as an authority figure. To illustrate this reasoning, Walton gives the example of a witness at a trial: if he had been caught lying and cheating in his own life, should the jury take his word for granted? No, according to Walton.

=== Guilt by association ===
Guilt by association, that is accusing an arguer because of his alleged connection with a discredited person or group, can sometimes also be a type of ad hominem fallacy when the argument attacks a source because of the similarity between the views of someone making an argument and other proponents of the argument.

This form of the argument is as follows:

1. Individual S makes claim C.
2. Individual S is also associated with Group G, who has an unfavorable reputation.
3. Therefore, individual S and his views are questionable.

Academic Leigh Kolb gives as an example that the 2008 US vice-presidential candidate Sarah Palin attacked Barack Obama for having worked with Bill Ayers, who had been a leader in the Weather Underground terrorist group in the 1960s. Despite Obama denouncing every act of terrorism, his opponents still associated him with terrorism.

Guilt by association is frequently found in social and political debates. It also appears after major events (such as scandals and terrorism) linked to a specific group. Kolb cites the peak of attacks against Muslims in the US after the September 11 attacks.

=== Abusive ad hominem ===
Abusive ad hominem argument (or direct ad hominem) is associated with an attack to the character of the person carrying an argument. This kind of argument, besides usually being fallacious, is also counterproductive, as a proper dialogue is hard to achieve after such an attack.

Key issues in examining an argument to determine whether it is an ad hominem fallacy or not are whether the accusation against the person stands true or not, and whether the accusation is relevant to the argument. An example is a dialogue at the court, where the attorney cross-examines an eyewitness, bringing to light the fact that the witness was convicted in the past for lying. If the attorney's conclusion is that the witness is lying, that would be wrong. But if his argument would be that the witness should not be trusted, that would not be a fallacy.

=== Argument from commitment ===
An ad hominem argument from commitment is a type of valid argument that employs, as a dialectical strategy, the exclusive use of the beliefs, convictions, and assumptions of those holding the position being argued against, i.e., arguments constructed on the basis of what other people hold to be true. This usage is generally only encountered in specialist philosophical usage or in pre-20th century usages. This type of argument is also known as the ex concessis argument (Latin for 'from what has been conceded already').

== Use in debates ==
Ad hominem fallacies are considered to be uncivil and do not help create a constructive atmosphere for dialogue to flourish. An ad hominem attack is an attack on the character of the target who tends to feel the necessity to defend himself or herself from the accusation of being hypocritical. Walton has noted that it is so powerful of an argument that it is employed in many political debates. Since it is associated with negativity and dirty tricks, it has gained a bad fame, of being always fallacious.

Author Eithan Orkibi, having studied Israeli politics prior to elections, described two other forms of ad hominem attacks that are common during election periods. They both depend on the collective memory shared by both proponents and the audience. The first is the "precedent ad hominem", according to which the previous history of someone means that they do not fit for the office. It goes like this: "My opponent was (allegedly) wrong in the past, therefore he is wrong now". The second one is a behavioral ad hominem: "my opponent was not decent in his arguments in the past, so he is not now either". These kinds of attacks are based on the inability of the audience to have a clear view of the amount of false statements by both parts of the debate.

== Criticism as a fallacy ==
Walton has argued that ad hominem reasoning is not always fallacious, and that in some instances, questions of personal conduct, character, motives, etc., are legitimate and relevant to the issue, as when it directly involves hypocrisy, or actions contradicting the subject's words.

The philosopher Charles Taylor has argued that ad hominem reasoning (discussing facts about the speaker or author relative to the value of his statements) is essential to understanding certain moral issues due to the connection between individual persons and morality (or moral claims), and contrasts this sort of reasoning with the apodictic reasoning (involving facts beyond dispute or clearly established) of philosophical naturalism.

== See also ==
- argumentum ad personam
- "And you are lynching Negroes"
- Argument from authority
- Appeal to emotion
- Appeal to motive
- The Art of Being Right
- Character assassination
- Dogpiling (Internet)
- Ergo decedo
- Fair game (Scientology)
- Fake news
- False equivalence
- Fundamental attribution error
- Gaslighting
- Godwin's law
- Hostile witness
- List of fallacies
- Negative campaigning
- Poisoning the well
- Presumption of guilt
- Race card
- Red herring
- Reputation
- Shooting the messenger
- Smear campaign
- Straw man
- Tone policing
- Whataboutism

== Sources ==
- Bowell, Tracy; Kemp, Gary (2010). Critical Thinking: A Concise Guide. Abingdon, Oxon: Routledge. ISBN 978-0-415-47183-1.
- Copi, Irving M. (1986). Informal Logic. Macmillan. ISBN 978-0-02-324940-2.
- Hansen, Hans (2019). "Fallacies". In Zalta, Edward N. (ed.). The Stanford Encyclopedia of Philosophy.
- Kolb, Leigh (2019). "Guilt by Association". In Robert Arp; Steven Barbone; Michael Bruce (eds.). Bad Arguments: 100 of the Most Important Fallacies in Western Philosophy. Wiley Blackwell. pp. 351–353. doi:10.1002/9781119165811.ch83. ISBN 978-1-119-16580-4. S2CID 187211421.
- Lavery, Jonathan; Hughes, Willam (27 May 2008). Critical Thinking, fifth edition: An Introduction to the Basic Skills. Broadview Press. ISBN 978-1-77048-111-4.
- Lewis, Charlton; Short, Charles (1879). A Latin Dictionary. Nigel Gourlay. ISBN 9781999855789.
- Merriam-Webster (2019). "Definition of Ad Hominem".
- Nuchelmans, Gäbriel (1993). "On the Fourfold Root of the Argumentum ad Hominem". In Krabbe, Erik C. W.; Dalitz, Renée José; Smit, Pier (eds.). Empirical Logic and Public Debate.
- Olivesi, Aurélie (5 April 2010). "L'interrogation sur la compétence politique en 2007 : une question de genre ?". Quaderni (in French). 72 (72): 59–74. doi:10.4000/quaderni.486. ISSN 0987-1381.
- Orkibi, Eithan (27 February 2018). "Precedential Ad Hominem in Polemical Exchange: Examples from the Israeli Political Debate". Argumentation. 32 (4): 485–499. doi:10.1007/s10503-018-9453-2. ISSN 0920-427X. S2CID 254261480.
- Sommers, Christina (March 1991). "Argumentum ad feminam". Journal of Social Philosophy. 22 (1): 5–19. doi:10.1111/j.1467-9833.1991.tb00016.x. ISSN 0047-2786.
- Taylor, Charles (1995). "Explanation and Practical Reason". Philosophical Arguments. Harvard University Press. pp. 34–60. ISBN 9780674664760.
- Tindale, Christopher W. (22 January 2007). Fallacies and Argument Appraisal. Cambridge University Press. ISBN 978-1-139-46184-9.
- van Eemeren, F. H. (2001). Crucial Concepts in Argumentation Theory. Amsterdam University Press. ISBN 978-90-5356-523-0.
- van Eemeren, Frans H.; Grootendorst, Rob (2015). "The History of the Argumentum Ad Hominem Since the Seventeenth Century". Argumentation Library. Cham: Springer International Publishing. doi:10.1007/978-3-319-20955-5_32. ISBN 978-3-319-20954-8. ISSN 1566-7650.
- Walton, Douglas N. (1998). Ad Hominem Arguments. University of Alabama Press. ISBN 978-0-8173-0922-0.
- Walton, Douglas N. (2001). "Argumentation Schemes and Historical Origins of the Circumstantial Ad Hominem Argument" (PDF). Argumentation. 15 (2): 207–221. doi:10.1023/A:1011120100277. ISSN 0920-427X. S2CID 16864574.
- Walton, Douglas N. (2006). Fundamentals of Critical Argumentation. Cambridge University Press. ISBN 978-0-521-82319-7.
- Walton, Douglas N. (2008). Informal Logic: A Pragmatic Approach. Cambridge University Press.
- Walton, Douglas N. (27 April 2015). "informal logic". In Audi Robert (ed.). The Cambridge Dictionary of Philosophy. Cambridge University Press. ISBN 978-1-107-01505-0.
- Weston, Anthony (2018). A Rulebook for Arguments. Hackett Publishing Company, Incorporated. ISBN 978-1-62466-655-1.
- Wong, Andrew David (2017). Unmitigated Skepticism: The Nature and Scope of Pyrrhonism (PDF) (Doctor of Philosophy thesis). University of California.
- Wrisley, George (2019). "Ad Hominem: Circumstantial". In Robert Arp; Steven Barbone; Michael Bruce (eds.). Bad Arguments: 100 of the Most Important Fallacies in Western Philosophy. Wiley Blackwell. pp. 77–82. doi:10.1002/9781119165811.ch9. ISBN 978-1-119-16580-4. S2CID 171674012.
