= The Innovation Delusion =

2020 book about the importance of maintenance

- Author: Lee Vinsel; Andrew L. Russell
- Language: English
- Subject: How maintenance is underrated
- Publication date: September 8, 2020
- Pages: 272
- ISBN: 978-0-525-57568-9

The Innovation Delusion: How Our Obsession with the New Has Disrupted the Work that Matters Most is a book by historians of technology Lee Vinsel and Andrew L. Russell that was published in 2020. It argues that the pursuit of novel, unproven solutions and technologies at the expense of necessary and valuable work. The authors support the ability of technology to improve our lives, only opposing the 'innovation-speak' and the throwaway economy it promotes. It draws on the story of how society has devalued the work that underpins modern life and shifted focus away from the pursuit of growth at all costs and back toward neglected activities like maintenance, care, and upkeep. For community infrastructure like roads, the authors argue for a fix it first approach that prioritizes repairing existing assets over building new ones. The authors examine the differences between deferred maintenance and preventive maintenance. The authors highlight Charles Marohn, the founder of Strong Towns, as a prominent advocate of maintenance in cities, as well as the U.S. Defense Department for the portion of their budget dedicated to maintenance. Repair clinics and the right-to-repair movement also receive kind words. They also co-founded a group called The Maintainers.

== Critical reception ==
Sara Holder, critic for the Library Journal, noted that "Vinsel and Russell’s observations make a compelling counterpoint to the innovation mania that has dominated this decade."

Kirkus Reviews describes it as "A refreshing, cogently argued book that will hopefully make the rounds at Facebook, Google, Apple et al."

David A. Shaywitz in the Wall Street Journal agrees with the arguments in the book, adding only that front-line implementers of innovations should also share some of the spotlight with the maintainers that has been too focused on the innovators.

In Science, Dov Greenbaum and Mark Gerstein praise the book as a valuable contribution to looking past unhelpful buzzwords around innovation, while also noting that some of the heroes lauded like John Day Jr., could be described as innovators themselves.

== See also ==
- Appeal to novelty
