= Fix it First =

Infrastructure investment philosophy

Fix it First is a philosophy about infrastructure investment that prioritizes bringing existing infrastructure up to acceptable standards before spending money on building out new infrastructure. Proponents acknowledge that politicians love to cut ribbons on new projects even if the biggest needs involve fixing hidden infrastructure like water or sewage lines.

In 2004, the National Governors Association considered 'fix-it-first' to be a best-practice given the increase in the cost of new construction. In 2021, Pete Buttigieg embraced the strategy to try and reduce the deferred maintenance of transportation infrastructure in the United States at the beginning of his term as Transportation Secretary. Marc Scribner endorsed this approach in Reason magazine arguing it was the 'lowest-risk' approach to infrastructure investment given the uncertainty about future transportation needs. The Post and Courier editorial board also advocated for South Carolina to raise money for fix-it-first programs and not new construction, citing the worsening of road quality in Charleston County. Advocacy organizations that prefer a 'fix it first' approach include the Public Interest Research Group, Environmental Law and Policy Center, Third Way and Transportation for America. Charles Marohn cautions cities against taking federal money to build new infrastructure that will create significant ongoing maintenance burdens. Lee Vinsel and Andrew L. Russell argue that federal money should instead be prioritized for maintenance that (with some exceptions) does not add new burdens to state and local governments, and that "'Fix it First' should be the reigning motto of our national infrastructure policy". The Brookings Institution published a 2011 paper that argued that a 'fix it first' approach for the U.S. highway system provided the best cost-benefit ratio.

A 2024 survey in the UK by YouGov found that 80% of the respondents preferred a fix-it-first approach (such as filling potholes) to building new roads.

== See also ==
- Adaptive reuse
- Best practice
- Fiscal responsibility
- Infill
- Longtermism
- Novelty bias
- Right to repair
- Risk mitigation
- Technical debt
