= ELPC =

ELPC may refer to:

- East Liberty Presbyterian Church in Pittsburgh, Pennsylvania
- Environmental Law and Policy Center
