= Chronocentrism =

Viewing certain time-periods more favorably

Chronocentrism is the assumption that a certain time-period (typically the present) is better, more important, or a more significant frame of reference than other time periods, either past or future. The perception of more positive attributes such as morality, technology, and sophistication to one's own time may lead a member of a collectivity to impose their forms of time on others and to impede efforts towards a common temporal period.

== History ==
Chronocentrism (from the Greek chrono- meaning "time") was coined by sociologist Jib Fowles in an article in the journal Futures in February 1974. Fowles described chronocentrism as "the belief that one's own times are paramount, that other periods pale in comparison". A critical view described it as the belief that only the present counts and that the past is irrelevant except to serve as a reference to a few basic assumptions about what went before. More recently, it has been defined as "the egotism that one's own generation is poised on the very cusp of history". The term had been used earlier in a study about attitudes to ageing in the workplace. Chronocentricity: "...only seeing the value of one's own age cohort...described the tendency for younger managers to hold negative perceptions of the abilities or other work-related competencies of older employees." This type of discrimination is a form of ageism.

== Antichronocentrism ==
The Long Now Foundation is an organization that encourages the use of 5-digit years, e.g. "02024" instead of "2024," to help emphasize how early the present time is in their vision of the timeline of humanity. The use of two-digit years before Y2K was an example of chronocentrism (in the early years of computing, the years 2000 and 1899 were believed to be too far in the future or the past, and thus of less importance than being able to save two digits in computerizing and typing out years).

== Applications ==
The "Copernican time principle" is a temporal analog of the Copernican principle for space, which states that no spatial location is any more or less special of a frame of reference than any other spatial location (i.e., that our physical universe has no center). Some authors have extended this to also include that no point in time is any more or less special than any other point in time (e.g., in outdated steady-state theories), though this cannot be universally applied (e.g., the Big-Bang singularity is a special point in time that can be logically used as a frame of reference to date later events).

Until the twentieth century, chronocentrism was the norm in musical performance because musicians assumed that playing styles survived largely unchanged from previous centuries. For instance, Romantic musicians used contemporary styles when performing earlier repertoire.

== See also ==
- Ageism
- Anthropocentrism
- Chronological snobbery
- Copernicanism
- End of history
- Geocentrism
- Philosophy of history
- Presentism (historical analysis)
- Rosy retrospection
