= Futurewise =

Futurewise may refer to:

- Futurewise (book), a 2007 book by Patrick Dixon
- Futurewise.org, a Washington State growth management organization
