= Street Road =

Street Road may refer to:

- Pennsylvania Route 132 in Bucks County
- Pennsylvania Route 926 in Chester County

== See also ==
- Stroad
