= Presentism =

Presentism may refer to:

- Presentism (historical analysis)
- Philosophical presentism

== See also ==
- Presenteeism
