= Criticism of suburbia =

- Field: Urban studies, Sociology, Architecture
- Origin: Late 19th–early 20th century urban planning discourse
- Key people: Robin Boyd, Francis Michael Longstreth Thompson, William Levitt (by context), Jane Jacobs
- Purpose: Analysis and critique of suburban development patterns, aesthetics, and socio-cultural impacts

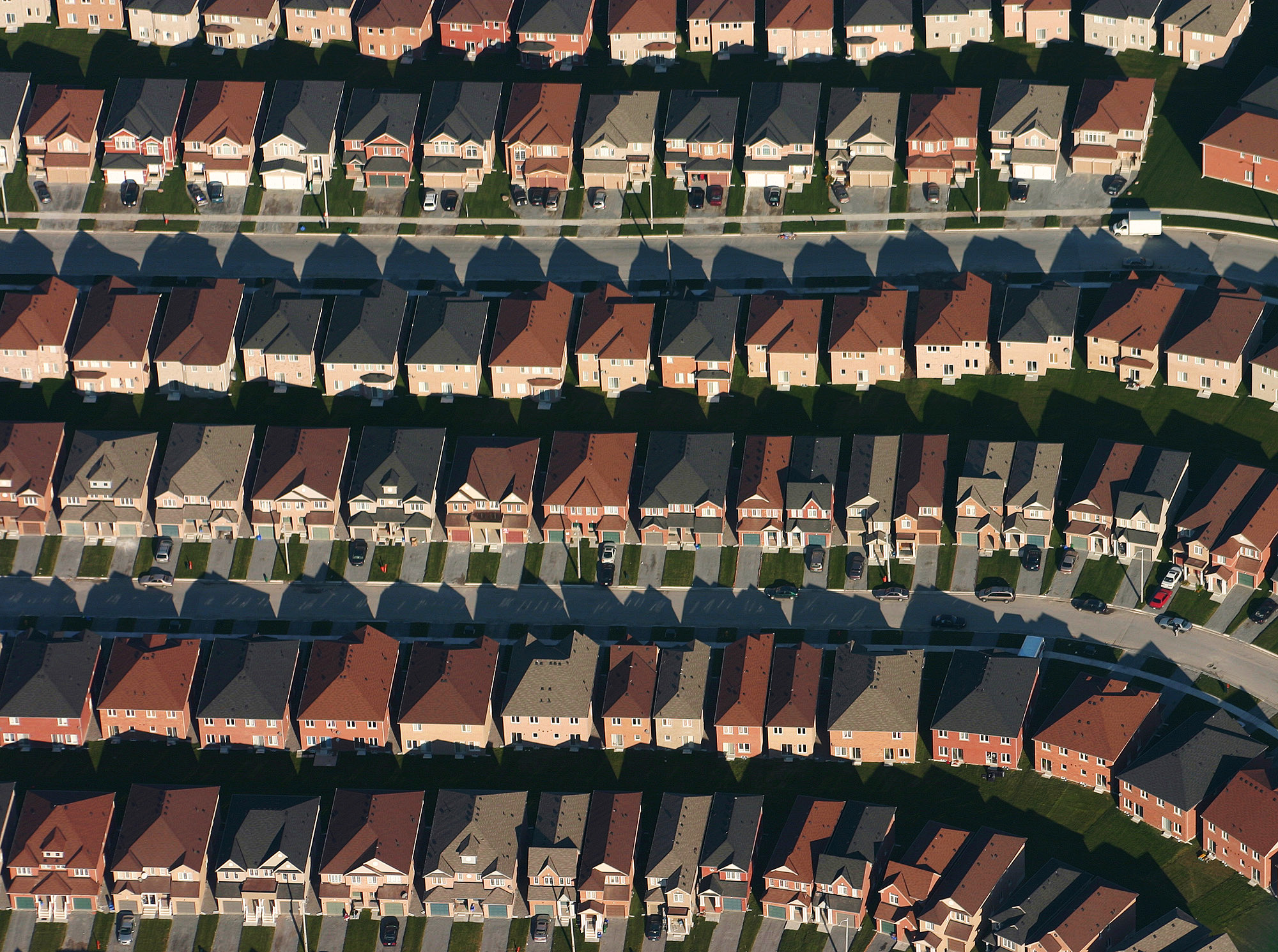
An aerial view of housing developments near Markham, Ontario; suburban development is often criticized for its uniformity

Mainstream criticism of suburbia emerged during the housing boom of the 1950s, reflecting concerns about the culture of aspirational homeownership and its societal impacts. Critiques of modern suburbs date back to the late 19th and early 20th centuries, with early urban planners and social theorists questioning the development of suburbia. The discourse is particularly focused in the English-speaking world and the Anglosphere, being prevalent both in popular culture and academia.

== In the United States ==
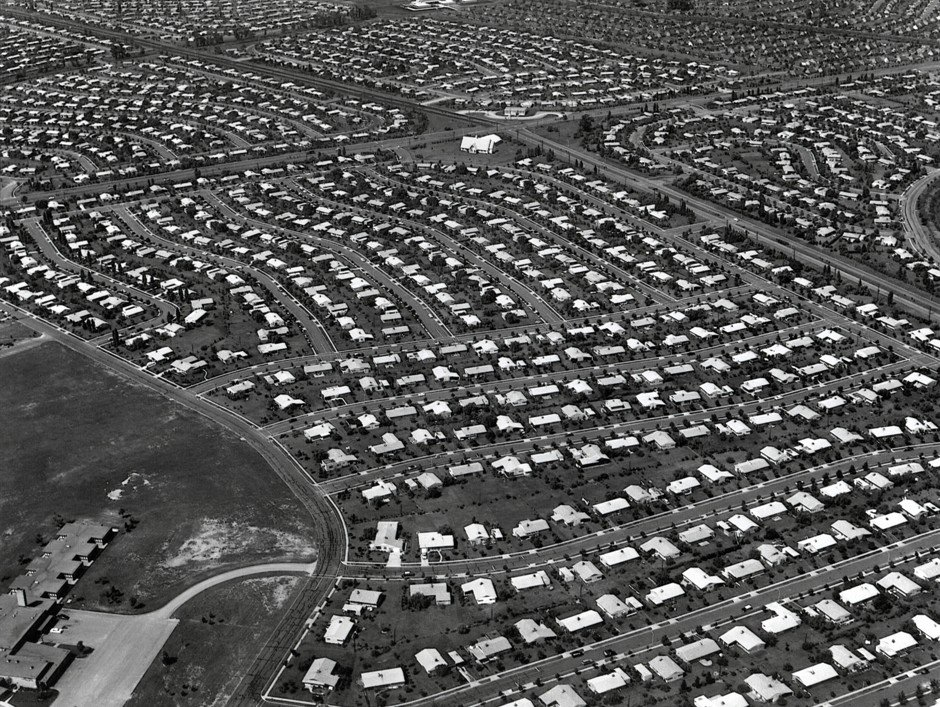
Aerial view of Levittown, Pennsylvania c. 1959; William Levitt refused to sell Levittown homes to people of color

More than half of Americans have described their neighborhoods as suburban, though some have recognized the fact that there is no clear definition of what "suburban" actually means.

=== Environmental issues ===
Sprawl leads to increased driving, which in turn leads to vehicle emissions that contribute to air pollution and its attendant negative impacts on human health. In addition, the reduced physical activity implied by increased automobile use has negative health consequences. The American Journal of Public Health and the American Journal of Health Promotion have both stated that there is a significant connection between sprawl, obesity, and hypertension.

A heavy reliance on automobiles increases traffic throughout the city as well as automobile crashes, pedestrian injuries, and air pollution.

=== Increased infrastructure/transportation costs ===
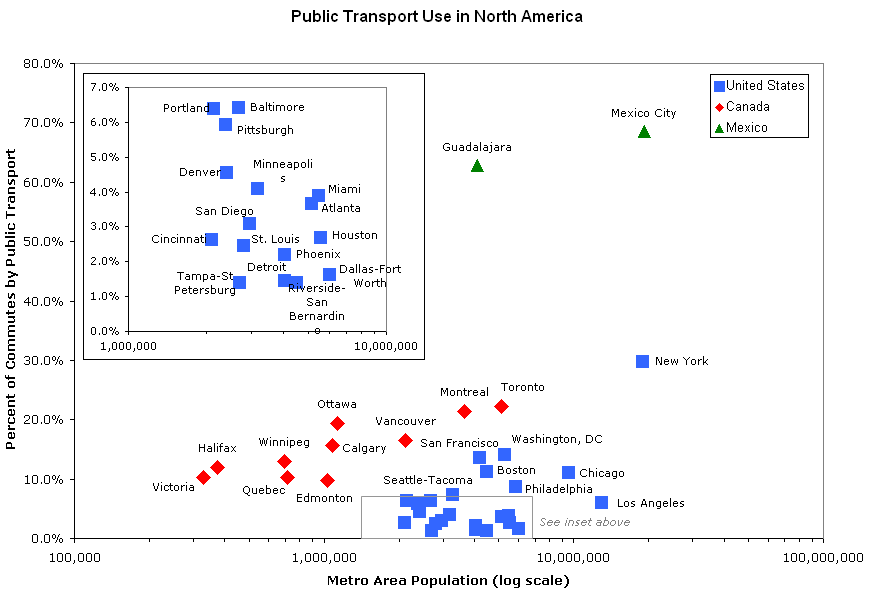

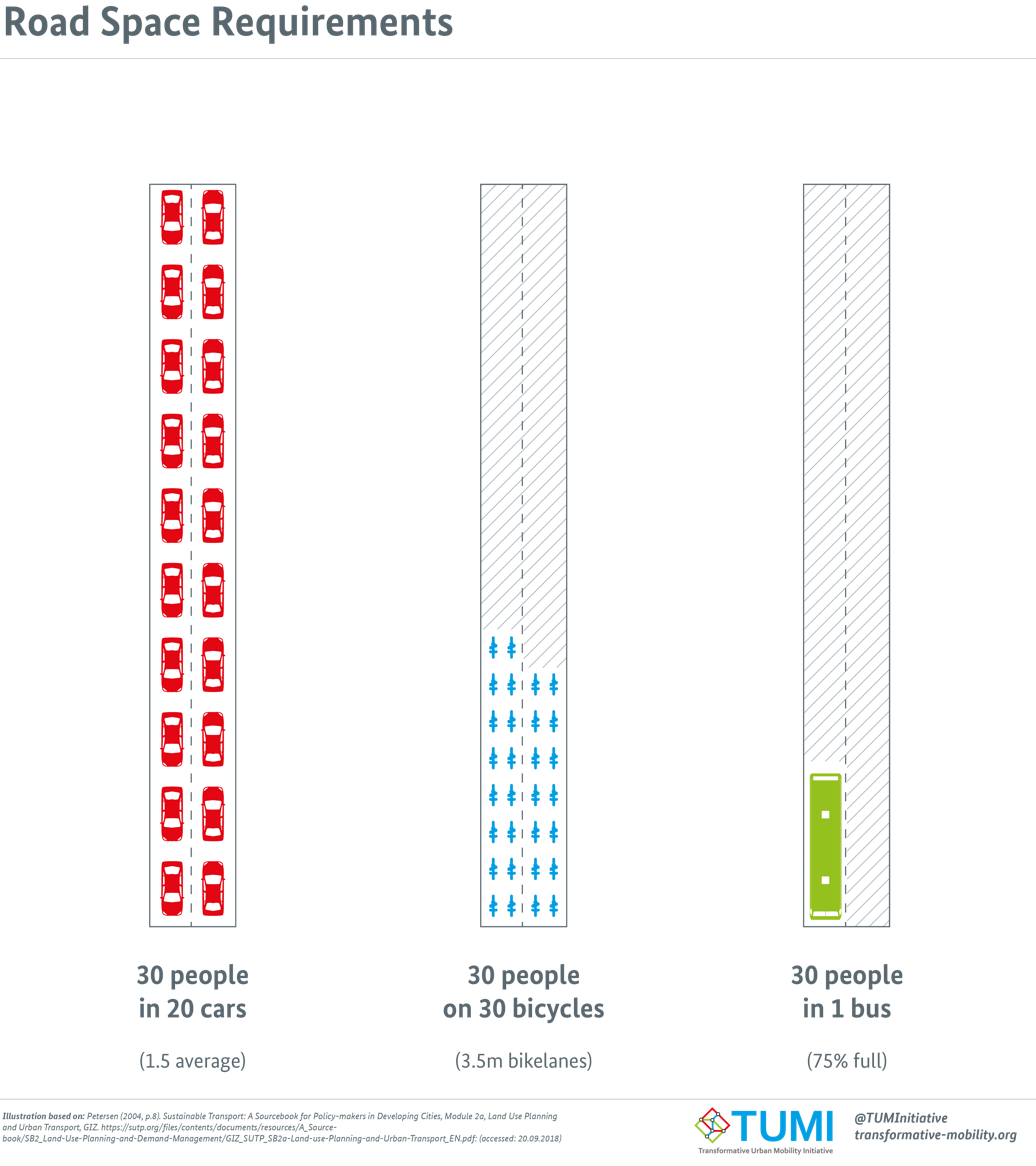
Road Space Requirements

Living in larger, more spread out spaces generally makes public services more expensive. Since car usage becomes endemic and public transport often becomes significantly more expensive, city planners are forced to build highway and parking infrastructure, which in turn decreases taxable land and revenue, and decreases the desirability of the area adjacent to such structures. Providing services such as water, sewers, and electricity is also more expensive per household in less dense areas, given that sprawl increases lengths of power lines and pipes, necessitating higher maintenance costs.

Residents of low density areas spend a higher proportion of their income on transportation than residents of high density areas. The unplanned nature of outward urban development is commonly linked to increased dependency on cars. In 2003, a British newspaper calculated that urban sprawl would cause an economic loss of £3,905 per year, per person through cars alone, based on data from the RAC estimating that the average cost of operating a car in the UK at that time was £5,000 a year. Train travel (assuming a citizen commutes every day of the year, with a ticket cost of 3 pounds) would be £1,095.

== In Canada ==
The Canadian government has no definition of 'suburbia' or suburbs. Independent studies have found that 50% to 66% of Canadians live in what the respective researchers define as suburban.

== In Australia ==
Sprawling cities define the urban Australian landscape. The "quarter-acre" block is often cited as fundamental to the Australian Dream; it has both cultural and political currency. In 1901, the year of Australian Federation, "almost 70 percent of Sydney's population were living in the suburbs".

Commentary by "intellectuals and others seeking to delineate the suburb" has been characterized by "conformity, control and some sense of false consciousness".

=== Suburbia bashing ===
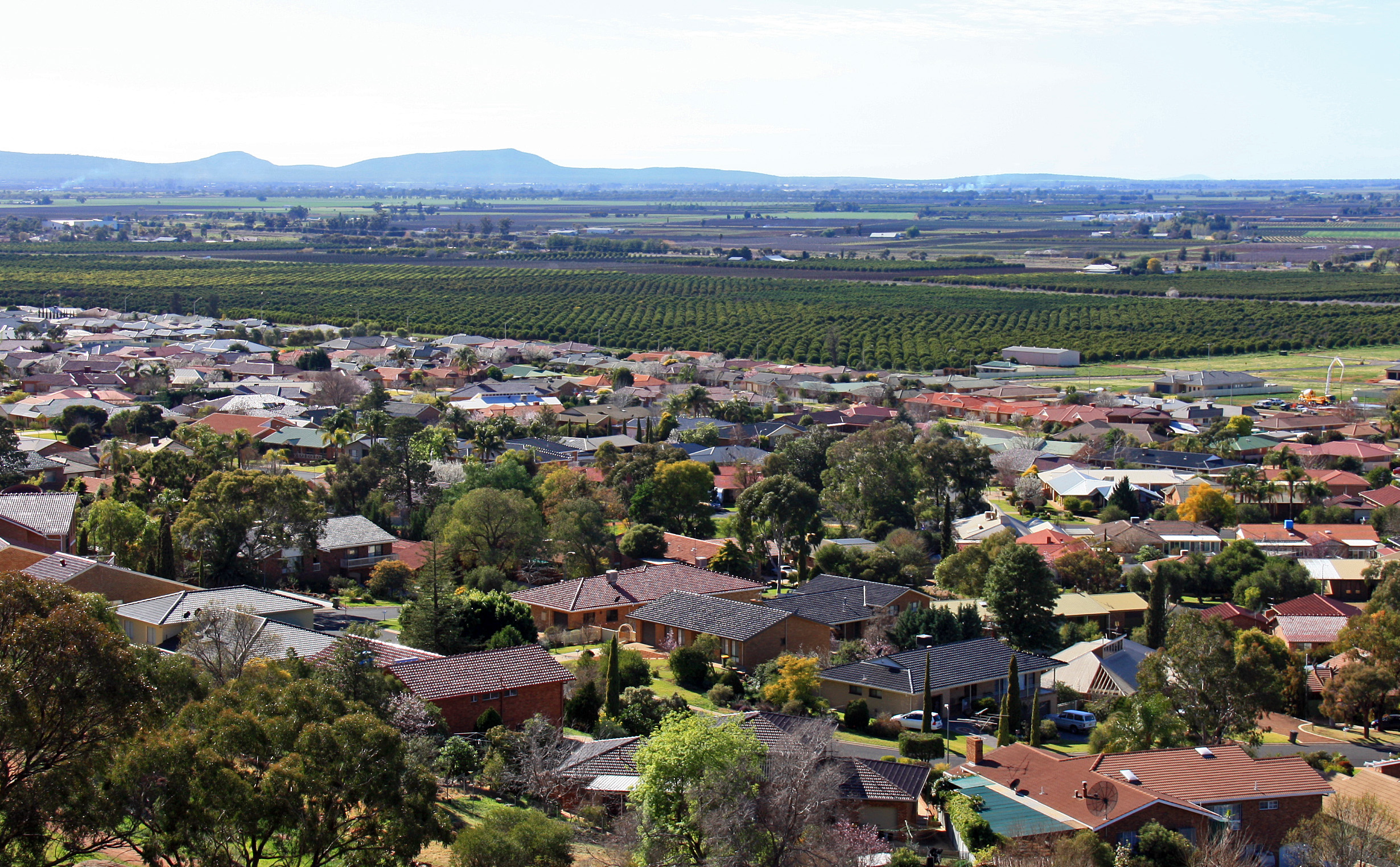
Suburban housing in Griffith, New South Wales

Negative discourse about suburbia, often termed "suburbia bashing", exists in mainstream media discussions. Dame Edna Everage typifies this, as she demonstrates both "nostalgia and disdain for the Australian suburb and suburban life".

Prominent journalist Allan Ashbolt satirized the suburb that represented Australian nationalism, rooted in the post-World War II era, as passive and uninspired, inscribed strongly in spatial terms. In 1966, he described Australian reality accordingly:

"Behold the man – the Australian of today – on Sunday morning in the suburbs when the high decibel drone of the motor-mower is calling the faithful to worship. A block of land, a brick veneer, and the motor-mower beside him in the wilderness – what more does he want to sustain him."

Ashbolt, among others, represent a "tradition of abuse of the suburbs and of the majority of Australians" in Australian mainstream media.

==== Suburbia vs the Australian bush ====
Suburbia bashing is entrenched in questions of national identity. Disparaging commentary about the suburbs often appears in contrast to the national mythology of the Australian bush. The landscape that is portrayed in the tourism advertisements, by poets and painters, does not represent the experience of the majority of Australians. The suburb and the bush are counterposed, "the bush (cast as the authentic Australian landscape) with the city (regarded as blighted foreign import)". The bush landscape is a masculine construction of a more "authentic notion of Australian national identity" exemplified by the poetry of Henry Lawson. Conversely, the suburb is feminised, epitomised by Dame Edna for more than fifty years, and more recently, by comedic team Jane Turner and Gina Riley in Kath & Kim.

=== Australian ugliness ===
Architect and cultural critic, Robin Boyd, also criticized suburbia, referring to it as the "Australian ugliness". Boyd observed a "pursuit of respectability" in suburban spaces. Boyd writes of a contrived and superficial sense of place, centered on a "fear of reality":

"The Australian ugliness begins with fear of reality, denial of the need for the everyday environment to reflect the heart of the human problem, satisfaction with veneer and cosmetic effects. It ends in betrayal of the element of love and a chill near the root of national self-respect."

The ugliness that Boyd describes is qualified as "skin deep". However, in the tradition of suburbia bashing, he proposes that there is an emptiness of spirit that can be read through an uninformed appreciation for aesthetics.

More recently there has been suggestion of a "new Australian ugliness". New suburban developments have seen the proliferation of what have become known as "McMansions". McMansions epitomize the suburbia that is attacked by Boyd for both its monotony and "featurism" Journalist Miranda Devine refers to an elitist perception that those who live in such suburban assemblages display a "poverty of spirit and a barrenness of mind" that is derived from a politics of aesthetics and taste, as expressed by Boyd fifty years ago. In this "new Australian ugliness" some commentators attribute a rise in consumer culture: "There's a concern about over-consumption. But there's little thought of why – beyond advertising-driven gullibility". Academic Mark Peel has rejected notions of gullible "consuming" residents of new suburbs by explaining his own "choice" to move to Melbourne's outer suburbs.

Peel alludes to a discourse of suburbia that is elitist, and is based on matters of taste which have translated into a socio-cultural divide. When Miranda Devine refers to the elites, she refers to an inner-city population. The divide is between the urbanites and the suburbanites, and the conflict is over national identity.

== In the United Kingdom ==
Suburbia in the United Kingdom has been a subject of criticism for many decades, with critiques focusing on various social, cultural, and environmental aspects. The criticisms often revolve around themes such as conformity, lack of community spirit, environmental degradation, and socio-economic divides.

=== Historical context ===
Suburban development in the UK accelerated during the interwar and post-World War II periods, driven by a mix of factors such as the desire for better living conditions away from overcrowded urban centers, government initiatives encouraging homeownership, and improvements in transportation that made commuting more practical. However, critiques of suburbia among certain academics emerged much earlier. In the 1876 edition of The Architect an anonymous contributor remarked, "A modern suburb, is a place which is neither one thing nor the other; it has neither the advantage of the town nor the open freedom of the country, but manages to combine in nice equality of proportion of both." Similarly in Francis Longstreth Thompson's seminal work The Rise of Suburbia, he quotes Sir Walter Besant, who describes suburban life as, "The life of the suburb without any society; no social gatherings or institutions; as dull a life as mankind ever tolerated."

== In Japan ==
Suburbia in Japan has been subject to various criticisms, focusing on social, cultural, and economic aspects. These critiques often highlight issues such as aging populations, social isolation, economic inefficiencies, and environmental concerns.

=== Historical context ===
Post-World War II, Japan experienced rapid urbanization, leading to significant suburban development. The government implemented policies to address housing shortages, resulting in the construction of extensive suburban housing complexes. These developments were initially aimed at providing affordable housing for middle-income families. However, over time, shifts in housing policies led to socioeconomic imbalances and challenges in these suburban areas.

=== Social criticisms ===
==== Aging population and social isolation ====
Japanese suburbs have witnessed a demographic shift toward aging populations. Many younger residents have migrated to urban centers, leaving behind older adults who often experience social isolation. This has led to instances of "solitary deaths"(kodokushi), where individuals pass away unnoticed, highlighting the lack of community support systems in these areas.

==== Conformity and social pressure ====
In Japanese rural and suburban communities, there is often a strong emphasis on social conformity. Newcomers or individuals who do not adhere to established social norms may experience social exclusion or pressure to conform, leading to a lack of diversity and individual expression within these communities. This phenomenon is discussed in the article "Law and Community in Japan: The Role of Legal Rules in Suburban Formation," which examines how legal rules are utilized to maintain harmonious living environments in suburban neighborhoods, often reinforcing social conformity.

=== Economic criticisms ===
==== Economic inefficiency ====
The sprawling nature of Japanese suburbs has led to economic inefficiencies. Maintaining infrastructure such as roads, utilities, and public services in these areas incurs higher costs per household compared to more densely populated urban centers. This has strained local government budgets and led to disparities in service quality.

==== Property depreciation ====
Suburban areas have faced challenges related to property depreciation. As populations decline and properties age, there is a decrease in property values, leading to negative equity risks for homeowners. This economic instability can deter potential new residents, exacerbating population decline.

=== Environmental criticism ===
The expansion of suburban areas has contributed to urban sprawl, leading to the loss of agricultural land and natural habitats. This sprawl has increased reliance on automobiles, contributing to higher greenhouse gas emissions and environmental degradation.

== See also ==
- The 'Burbs
- Home ownership in Australia
- Home-ownership in the United States
- Housing in Japan
- White flight § Government-aided white flight
- Urban planning
- Not Just Bikes
- Urbanism
- Walkability
- American Dream
- Community (social unit)

== Bibliography ==
- Adams, L. J. (1 September 2006). "Sundown Towns: A Hidden Dimension of American Racism". Journal of American History. 93 (2): 601–602. doi:10.2307/4486372. ISSN 0021-8723. JSTOR 4486372.
- Ashbolt, Allan (December 1966). "Godzone 3: Myth and Reality". Meanjin Quarterly. 25 (4): 353.
- Boyd, Robin (1960). The Australian Ugliness. Melbourne: Penguin Books.
- Devine, Miranda (24 October 2004). "Copping the bile in Kellyville". The Sun-Herald.
- Gleeson, Brendan (2006). The Australian Heartlands: Making Space for Hope in the Suburbs. Sydney: Allen and Unwin.
- Healy, Chris (1994). "xv". In Ferber, Sarah; Healy, Chris; McAuliffe, Chris (eds.). Beasts of Suburbia: Reinterpreting Cultures in Australian Suburbs. Melbourne: Melbourne University Press.
- Horin, Adele (4 August 2005). "The end of the mythical quarter-acre block". The Age.
- Peel, Mark (16 September 2007). "McMansions: The inside story of life on the outer". The Age.
- Simons, Margaret (2005). Schultz, Julianne (ed.). "Ties that Bind". Griffith Review: People Like Us. 8, Winter: 11–36.
- Turnball, Sue (2008). "Mapping the Vast Suburban Tundra: Australian comedy from Dame Edna to Kath and Kim". International Journal of Cultural Studies. 11 (1): 15–32. doi:10.1177/1367877907086390. S2CID 146717661.
