= Neophile =

Personality type characterized by an affinity for novelty

Neophile or Neophiliac, a term popularised by author Robert Anton Wilson, is a personality type characterized by a strong affinity for novelty. The term was used earlier by Christopher Booker in his 1969 book The Neophiliacs, and by J. D. Salinger in his 1965 short story "Hapworth 16, 1924".

== Characteristics ==
Neophiles/Neophiliacs have the following basic characteristics:

- The ability to adapt rapidly to extreme change.
- A distaste or downright loathing of routine.
- A desire to experience novelty.
- A corresponding and related desire to create novelty.

A neophile is distinct from a revolutionary in that anyone might become a revolutionary if pushed far enough by the reigning authorities or social norms, whereas neophiles are revolutionaries by nature. Their intellectual abhorrence of tradition and repetition usually bemoans a deeper emotional need for constant novelty and change. The meaning of neophile approaches and is not mutually exclusive to the term visionary, but differs in that a neophile actively seeks first-hand experience of novelty rather than merely pontificating about it.

The opposite of a neophile is a neophobe; a person with an aversion to novelty and change. Robert Anton Wilson speculates in his 1983 book Prometheus Rising that the Industrial Revolution and related enlightenment represents one of the first periods of history in which neophiles were a dominant force in society. Wilson observes that neophobes tend to regard neophiles, especially extreme ones, with fear and contempt, and to brand them with titles such as "witch," "satanist," "heretic," etc.

== Types ==
Open-source advocate and programmer Eric S. Raymond observes that this personality is especially prevalent in certain fields of expertise; in business, these are primarily computer science and other areas of high technology. Raymond speculates that the rapid progress of these fields (especially computers) is a result of this. A neophile's love of novelty is likely to lead them into subjects outside of the normal areas of human interest. Raymond observes a high concentration of neophiles in or around what he calls "leading edge subcultures" such as science fiction fandom, neo-paganism, transhumanism, etc. as well as in or around nontraditional areas of thought such as fringe philosophy or the occult. Raymond observes that most neophiles have roving interests and tend to be widely well-read.

There is more than one type of neophile. There are social neophiles (the extreme social butterfly), intellectual neophiles (the revolutionary philosopher and the technophile), and physical/kinetic neophiles (the extreme sports enthusiast). These tendencies are not mutually exclusive, and might exist simultaneously in the same individual.

The word "neophilia" has particular significance in Internet and hacker culture. The New Hacker's Dictionary gave the following definition to neophilia:

The trait of being excited and pleased by novelty. Common among most hackers, SF fans, and members of several other connected leading-edge subcultures, including the pro-technology 'Whole Earth' wing of the ecology movement, space activists, many members of Mensa, and the Discordian/neo-pagan underground (see geek). All these groups overlap heavily and (where evidence is available) seem to share characteristic hacker tropisms for science fiction, music.

Research has uncovered a possible link between certain predisposition to some kind of neophilia and increased levels of the enzyme monoamine oxidase A.

== See also ==
- Fad
- Technophilia
- Technophobia
- Futurism
- Novelty bias
- Novelty seeking
- Low arousal theory
