= Transportation for America =

US lobbying group and think tank

- Formation: 2008; 18 years ago
- Type: 501(c)(3) organization
- Headquarters: 1350 Eye Street NW, Suite 425, Washington, D.C., U.S.
- Region served: United States
- Director: Beth Osborne
- Chair: John Robert Smith
- Parent organization: Smart Growth America
- Website: t4america.org

Transportation for America (or T4A) is an American policy organization that supports progressive transportation and land use policy. The transportation program of Smart Growth America, T4A supports reforming transportation policy at the federal, state, and local levels.

== History ==
During the first Trump presidency, the organization criticized the administration over proposed cuts to federal funding for public transit. In 2020, the organization's director Beth Osborne criticized efforts to cut transit funding amid the economic crisis that emerged in the COVID-19 pandemic.

In 2021, T4A urged the Biden administration to allocate increased funding for public transportation. Alongside multiple labor unions and environmental organization, T4A urged the addition of $10 billion in public transit funding in the White House-backed reconciliation bill.

== Policy goals ==
According to the organization, its policy goals include greater investments in public transportation, smart growth, and environmentalism. T4A has engaged with federal policymakers to push for increased funding for public transit and a Fix it First approach to infrastructure investment.

== Membership ==
In addition to individuals who may participate, T4A's membership roster includes a number of governments, as well as housing, business, environmental, public health, transportation, equitable development, and other organizations.

== Leadership ==
The current director of Transportation for America is Beth Osborne, who formerly served as Acting Assistant Secretary for Transportation Policy and as Deputy Assistant Secretary for Transportation Policy in the Department of Transportation during the Obama administration.
