= Incremental Development Alliance =

American nonprofit

- Founded: 2015
- Type: Nonprofit
- Fields: Missing middle housing
- Website: www.incrementaldevelopment.org

The Incremental Development Alliance is a nonprofit based in the United States that helps local citizens build small-scale real estate projects intended to strengthen neighborhoods. The organization started in 2015 with a focus on missing middle housing like duplexes, triplexes and quadplexes, especially on infill sites with vacant buildings or lots. This is done in part through trainings and boot camps that facilitate connections between local small-scale builders, as well as consulting on specific projects. By September 2026, they had trained more than 10,000 developers.

== See also ==
- Iterative and incremental development
- Strong Towns
