= Appeal to tradition =

Logical fallacy in which a thesis is deemed correct on the basis of tradition

Appeal to tradition (also known as argumentum ad antiquitatem or argumentum ad antiquitam, appeal to antiquity, or appeal to common practice) is a claim in which a thesis is deemed correct on the basis of correlation with past or present tradition. The appeal takes the form of "this is right because we've always done it this way", and is a logical fallacy. The opposite of an appeal to tradition is an appeal to novelty, in which one claims that an idea is superior just because it is new.

An appeal to tradition essentially makes two assumptions that may not be necessarily true:

- The old way of thinking was proven correct when introduced, i.e., since the old way of thinking was prevalent, it was necessarily correct.

In reality, this may be false—the tradition might be entirely based on incorrect grounds.

- The past justifications for the tradition are still valid.

In reality, the circumstances may have changed; this assumption may also therefore have become untrue.

Appeal to tradition imports the value of not needing to reinvent ways to do things for which effective ways have already been established. But, "is fallacious when it confuses a long tradition of careful testing with the mere tendency to hold on to ideas because they are old".

An appeal to tradition can be complicated by the possibility that different people might have different views, each with their own tradition to appeal to. For example, "Augustine's appeal to tradition against the Donatists is more complicated because the Donatists had appealed to tradition against the Catholics".

== Argument from inertia ==
A close relative/variant of the appeal to tradition is the argument from inertia or appeal to inertia (sometimes called "Stay the Course"), which states a mistaken status quo, potentially related to existing customs be maintained for its own sake, usually because making a change would require admission of fault in the mistake or because correcting the mistake would require extraordinary effort and resources.

Its name derives from inertia, a concept in physics representing the resistance of any physical object to any change in its velocity.

== Contrasting fallacies ==
- Where appeal to tradition might seek to avoid expending resources and effort on making the necessary change, the sunk-cost fallacy resists change due to that which has already been expended in the past to contribute to the present condition.
- The appeal to tradition counterpoints with the appeal to novelty (argumentum ad novitatem), where the alternative is sought simply on the basis that it is new, or that old customs are incorrect because of being traditional.

== See also ==
- Appeal to novelty
- Argument from authority
- Argument to moderation
- Common sense
- Conservatism
- Herd mentality
- Inductive reasoning
- List of logical fallacies
- Precedent
- Social inertia
- Status quo
