= Shiny object syndrome =

Undue focus on new and fashionable ideas

Shiny object syndrome describes the tendency of individuals or businesses to allocate the majority of their time and attention to ideas that are new, then move on quickly to newer ideas rather than following through. The term is used within management literature, popular psychological literature, and across the social and computer sciences.

== Usage ==
Shiny object syndrome is a pop-cultural, psychological concept wherein a lot of focus and attention are devoted to an idea for only a short period of time, then abandoned before being thoroughly developed. People who face a fear of missing out may be especially susceptible, as the distraction of shiny objects in themselves clouds judgment and focus.

== See also ==
- Appeal to novelty
- Novelty bias
