= Historian's fallacy =

Type of informal fallacy

The historian's fallacy is an informal fallacy that occurs when one assumes that decision makers of the past viewed events from the same perspective and having the same information as those subsequently analyzing the decision. It is not to be confused with presentism, a similar but distinct mode of historical analysis in which present-day ideas (such as moral standards) are projected into the past. The idea was first articulated by British literary critic Matthew Arnold in 1880 and later named and defined by American historian David Hackett Fischer in 1970.

== Concept ==
The idea that a critic can make erroneous interpretations of past works because of knowledge of subsequent events was first articulated by Matthew Arnold. In his 1880 essay The Study of Poetry, he wrote:

The course of development of a nation’s language, thought, and poetry, is profoundly interesting; and by regarding a poet’s work as a stage in this course of development we may easily bring ourselves to make it of more importance as poetry than in itself it really is, we may come to use a language of quite exaggerated praise in criticising it; in short, to overrate it. So arises in our poetic judgments the fallacy caused by the estimate which we may call historic.

The concept of the historian's fallacy was named and outlined in 1970 by David Hackett Fischer, who suggested it was analogous to William James's psychologist's fallacy. Fischer did not suggest that historians should refrain from retrospective analysis in their work, but he reminded historians that their subjects were not able to see into the future. As an example, he cited the well-known argument that Japan's surprise attack on Pearl Harbor should have been predictable in the United States because of the many indications that an attack was imminent. What this argument overlooks, says Fischer, citing the work of Roberta Wohlstetter, is that there were innumerable conflicting signs which suggested possibilities other than an attack on Pearl Harbor. Only in retrospect do the warning signs seem obvious; signs that pointed in other directions tend to be forgotten. (See also hindsight bias.)

In the field of military history, historians sometimes use what is known as the "fog of war technique" in hopes of avoiding the historian's fallacy. In this approach, the actions and decisions of the historical subject (such as a military commander) are evaluated primarily on the basis of what that person knew at the time, and not on future developments that the person could not have known. According to Fischer, this technique was pioneered by the American historian Douglas Southall Freeman in his influential biographies of Robert E. Lee and George Washington.

== See also ==
- Appeal to novelty – Fallacy in which validity is determined based on novelty
- Chronological snobbery – View of past as inferior to the present
- Cognitive bias – Systematic pattern of deviation from norm or rationality in judgment
- Hindsight bias – Type of confirmation bias
- List of cognitive biases
- Presentism – Interpreting the past using current views
