= Novelty bias =

Psychological appeal of newness

The prefontal cortex has a novelty bias that is attracted to new things. Daniel Levitin argues that this drive for novelty is on par with survival instincts like finding food and a mate, which can make focusing difficult and is why multitasking gives the brain dopamine hits even though it hinders productivity.

== Applications ==
It is a bias that smartphones are well-suited to leverage to grab our attention.

In childhood development, this drive towards novelty can lead to seeking dangerous new experiences like drugs, shoplifting or sexual promiscuity. It also can have positive benefits throughout life, such as the ability to adapt to change.

Novelty bias in the news is to be expected given the scope of the product being sold, and while uncontroversial when it comes to the weather it is not always as straightforwardly helpful when political coverage focuses on what is new instead of what is more consequential.

In medicine, it can result in a "tendency for an intervention to appear better when it is new" due in part to factors like unblinded organizers of a study who may be more enthusiastic about a novel approach.

== See also ==
- Appeal to novelty
- Hedonic treadmill
- Neophile
- Novelty seeking
- Radicalization
- Recency bias
- Sensationalism
- Shiny object syndrome
- The Innovation Delusion
