= Smart Growth America =

US non-profit organization

- Formation: 2000
- Type: 501(c)(3) organization
- Purpose: Urban planning, smart growth, sustainable transport, advocacy
- Headquarters: 1152 15th St NW, Suite 450, Washington, D.C., U.S.
- President and CEO: Beth Osborne
- Website: smartgrowthamerica.org

Smart Growth America (SGA) is a US non-profit 501(c)(3) organization headquartered in Washington, D.C.

Smart Growth America focuses on three specific priorities: Climate change and resilience, advancing racial equity, and creating healthy communities. SGA covers interrelated areas, including housing, zoning, planning, land use, economic development, transportation, and others.

SGA is also the leader of several advocacy programs that have a stake in how urban sprawl affects the environment, quality of life and economic sustainability.

== History ==
Smart Growth America was established in 2000. In 2002, SGA included over 70 groups, such as American Farmland Trust, the Natural Resources Defense Council, the League of Women Voters for Smart Growth, the National Low Income Housing Coalition, and the Enterprise Foundation. In 2003, Parris Glendening became the president of SGA's Leadership Institute.

In October 2015, the U.S. Department of Transportation's Federal Transit Administration (FTA) collaborated with SGA to create the Transit-Oriented Development Technical Assistance Initiative. The initiative uses federal funds to improve public transportation systems in order to foster economic development. SGA offers this initiative on-site aid, a network of allies, and communicative support.

== Approach to smart growth ==
In 2004, SGA commissioned the first survey examining neighborhood preferences among Americans, finding that almost 50% of households prefer transit accessibility and commercial proximity.

In a 2005 report detailing the interconnection between inner ring suburbs and metropolitan growth, SGA defines smart growth as follows: "Smart growth is well-planned development that protects open space and farmland, revitalizes communities, keeps housing affordable and provides more transportation choices." In a 2006 study examining the transportation benefits associated with smart growth policies, SGA "estimates that 69 percent of increased traffic can be attributed to factors associated with sprawl."

== Programs ==
=== LOCUS ===
In 2008, SGA launched LOCUS, an alliance for promoting sustainable urban development in the United States. LOCUS is a national network of real estate developers who launched the Rebuild America's Neighborhoods Campaign, promoting investment towards equitable and green urban development projects.

=== Transportation for America ===
In 2008, SGA, Reconnecting America, and the Surface Transportation Policy Partnership started a Transportation for America campaign aiming to reform the federal transportation law. Transportation for America advocates for a transportation system that emphasizes maintenance, implements safety designs, and unites the public.

=== National Complete Streets Coalition ===
In 2012, Smart Growth America the National Complete Streets Coalition, which advocates for safe and convenient transportation access. The coalition is composed of policy organizations, including the American Planning Association, and user groups, including America Bikes. By 2011, 125 jurisdictions across 38 states had implemented a Complete Streets policy.

=== State Smart Transportation Initiative ===
SGA co-operates, alongside the University of Wisconsin, the State Smart Transportation Initiative (SSTI). SSTI encourages environmentally sustainable transportation fostering economic development, while maintaining governmental transparency.

=== Form-Based Code Institute ===
Form-Based Code Institute (FBCI) strives to improve the general understanding of form-based codes through creating standards, offering educational programs, and fostering discussions. In a 2016 report about new urbanism in North Texas, FBCI advocated for the importance of form based codes in regulating physical development, rather than zoning areas by their usages.

== Partners ==
Partners include national, state and local groups, working on behalf of the environment, historic preservation, social equity, land conservation, neighborhood redevelopment, farmland protection, and labor. Member groups include the statewide "1000 Friends" organizations, Futurewise, GrowSmart Maine, New Jersey Future, Idaho Smart Growth, and the San Francisco Bay Area's Greenbelt Alliance.

== Financials ==
Smart Growth America's Form 990 shows that their donations rose from $4,826,301 in 2014 to $6,337,043 in 2017.

Donations

SGA's Form 990 shows that their compensation related expenses rose from $3,619,183 in 2014 to $4,028,232 in 2017.

Expenses
