= Not Just Bikes =

Urbanist YouTube channel

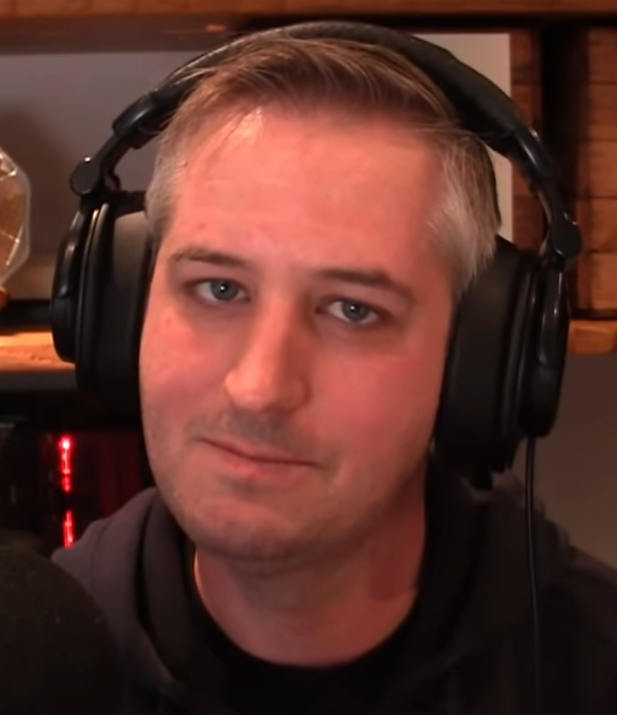
- The channel's current logo Jason Slaughter, during a videoconference, 2021
- Born: Jason Slaughter; London, Ontario, Canada
- Occupation: YouTuber

YouTube information
- Channel: Not Just Bikes
- Years active: 2019–present
- Genres: Built environment; Commentary; Education; Infrastructure; Transport; Urban design; Urbanism
- Subscribers: 1.47 million
- Views: 213 million
- Last updated: 16 October 2026

Not Just Bikes is a YouTube channel run by Canadian-born Dutch content creator Jason Slaughter. The channel examines urbanist issues, including but not limited to cycling in the Netherlands, and contrasts the transportation, infrastructure, and built environment of the Netherlands and other countries to those of the United States and Canada.

== Early life ==
Slaughter was raised in London, Ontario, Canada, which he has described as a "car-dependent hellscape."

As DJ Number Nine, Slaughter was a "Toronto Hard House, Hard Dance and Hard Trance DJ".

== Career ==
Slaughter was an employee of ATI Technologies and has lived in Taipei.

In Houston, while traveling for work on a multi-stop around-the-world airline ticket Slaughter found that his life was endangered, trying to walk a half mile from his hotel to a luggage store, such that he returned to his hotel, with his purchase, in a taxi.

== Amsterdam ==
A few years before 2022, he and his family migrated to Amsterdam in the Netherlands to move away from car-centric suburban sprawl. He claims that sprawl is common in Canada and the United States, and that urban sprawl and single-family zoning make it difficult to walk or cycle to everyday destinations. He also criticizes North American public transportation. He criticizes stroads for their cost, inefficiency, and lack of safety in the United States and Canada, and mentions how cities can improve them.

== YouTube career ==
Slaughter created his own YouTube channel named Not Just Bikes in mid-April 2019 after moving from Canada. On 7 July 2019, he uploaded his own first video of a POV demonstration of him using the Strawinskylaan bicycle parking garage in Amsterdam. In a series of videos titled "What Makes a City Great?" he explained his backstory, and the topic he would cover in his videos will be about the differences between transportation, infrastructure, and the built environment in the Netherlands on one side and in the United States and Canada on the other side.

== Nebula career ==
Streaming service Nebula distributes Day Pass, which follows Slaughter as he explores public transit in Asia, one city each episode, riding as much public transit as possible, for one day, presented in less than one hour.

== Personal life ==
Slaughter lives with his wife and two children, in Amsterdam, Netherlands.

== See also ==
- Bicycle-friendly
- Car-free movement
- Cycling advocacy
- Cycling in Amsterdam
- Cycling in the Netherlands
- Fietsersbond
- Walkability
- Walking audit
