= Presentism (historical analysis) =

Interpreting the past using current views

In literary and historical analysis, presentism is a term for the introduction of present-day ideas and perspectives into depictions or interpretations of the past. Some modern historians seek to avoid presentism in their work because they consider it a form of cultural bias and believe it creates a distorted understanding of their subject matter. The practice of presentism is regarded by some as a common fallacy when writing about the past.

The Oxford English Dictionary gives the first citation for presentism in its historiographic sense from 1916, and the word may have been used in this meaning as early as the 1870s. The historian David Hackett Fischer identifies presentism as a fallacy also known as the "fallacy of nunc pro tunc" (lit. "now for then"). He has written that the "classic example" of presentism was the so-called "Whig history", in which certain 18th- and 19th-century British historians wrote history in a way that used the past to validate their own political beliefs. This interpretation was presentist because it did not depict the past in objective historical context but instead viewed history only through the lens of contemporary Whig beliefs. In this kind of approach, which emphasizes the relevance of history to the present, things that do not seem relevant receive little attention, which results in a misleading portrayal of the past. "Whig history" or "whiggishness" are often used as synonyms for presentism particularly when the historical depiction in question is teleological or triumphalist.

== Sociological analysis ==
Presentism has a shorter history in sociological analysis, where it has been used to describe technological determinists who interpret a change in behavior as starting with the introduction of a new technology. For example, scholars such as Frances Cairncross proclaimed that the Internet had led to "the death of distance", but most community ties and many business ties had been transcontinental and even intercontinental for many years.

== Presentism in medieval studies ==
Presentism is a core concept for medievalist scholars because it unifies the varied post-medieval representations of the Middle Ages. Scholars like Louise D’Arcens and Kathleen Biddick state the value and unavoidability of viewing the medieval from within modern critical paradigms, seeing it as a mirror that can “reflect back histories of modernist or postmodernist identities”. Debates on presentism within the field revolve around the “double bind” of whether the European Middle Ages are the origin or non-origin of modern Western culture.

== Moral judgments ==
=== Avoiding presentism ===
Presentism is also a factor in the problematic question of history and moral judgments. Among historians, the orthodox view may be that reading modern notions of morality into the past is to commit the error of presentism. To avoid this, historians restrict themselves to describing what happened and attempt to refrain from using language that passes judgment. For example, when writing history about slavery in an era when the practice was widely accepted, letting that fact influence judgment about a group or individual would be presentist and thus should be avoided.

Critics respond that avoidance of presentism on issues such as slavery amounts to endorsement of the views of dominant groups, in this case, slaveholders, as against those who opposed them at the time. History professor Steven F. Lawson argues:

For example, with respect to slavery and race, historians, influenced by the present, have uncovered new data by raising new questions about racial issues. They have discovered, for instance, points of view and behavior among the enslaved that contradict older histories told primarily from the perspective of slaveholders. In addition to the various forms of resistance embraced by enslaved peoples, opponents of slavery in the 18th and 19th centuries, including Quakers and abolitionists, objected on moral grounds to the enslavement of Africans.

=== Critiques of moral neutrality ===
Critics further respond that to avoid moral judgments is to practice moral relativism. Some religious historians, including William of Ockham, Robert Merrihew Adams, and Philip L. Quinn, argue that morality is timeless, having been established by God; they say it is not anachronistic to apply timeless standards to the past. (In this view, while mores may change, morality does not.)

Others argue that application of religious standards has varied over time as well. Augustine of Hippo, for example, holds that there exist timeless moral principles, but contends that certain practices (such as polygamy) were acceptable in the past because they were customary but now are neither customary nor acceptable.

Fischer, for his part, writes that while historians might not always manage to avoid the fallacy completely, they should at least try to be aware of their biases and write history in such a way that they do not create a distorted depiction of the past.

In 2022, James H. Sweet wrote an article (Note: If we don’t read the past through the prism of contemporary social justice issues—race, gender, sexuality, nationalism, capitalism—are we doing history that matters? [...] If history is only those stories from the past that confirm current political positions, all manner of political hacks can claim historical expertise. Too many Americans have become accustomed to the idea of history as an evidentiary grab bag to articulate their political positions.) observing a "trend towards presentism" in contemporary historical scholarship, while also critiquing The 1619 Project. Sweet's article sparked much commotion. Dominic Green, among other conservatives, drew on Sweet's arguments to depict "the woke mob" growing in influence in historical scholarship, while at the same time repudiating Sweet himself for allegedly giving in to the "woke mob" when Sweet apologized. (Sweet had eventually apologized for what he called "my ham-fisted attempt at provocation", writing, "my provocation completely missed the mark".) Writing for The Chronicle of Higher Education, historian David A. Bell responded to the debate in an article entitled "Two Cheers for Presentism". Responding to Bell, Joan Wallach Scott observed a "moment of unprecedented attacks on the teaching of history", which "Bell misses". Nonetheless, she observed issues in not just overt defenses of presentism but also the opponents to presentism, while also fundamentally taking issue with "the recent debates on presentism" themselves. Scott wrote, "[w]hile we can all cite disturbing examples of students and faculty on the left seeking to censor what can be taught or even spoken, the concerted attack from the right — in the ultimate form of state laws prohibiting the teaching of so-called critical race theory, the 1619 Project, gender and sexuality, and other topics — are much more dangerous to [...] the practice of history". Historian Keisha N. Blain responded to the debates around Sweet: "Black historians have long recognized the role of the present in shaping our narratives of the past. We have never had the luxury of writing about the past as though it were divorced from present concerns."

John Quiggin wrote, "when academic opponents of wokeism/presentism say that current moral standards are being imposed on the past, what they mean is that racist views that are now deprecated were once dominant, and vice versa. [...] / The real issue isn’t to do with time, it’s whether any moral standards at all apply to history. Rather than saying that (for example) Pol Pot was a man of his times and exempt from contemporary judgements, they should just say that it’s not their job to decide whether genocide is good or bad, just to report the facts. That’s a position [...] that, if accepted, will accelerate the demise of history as an academic [discipline]".

== See also ==
- Anachronism
- Chronological snobbery
- Chronocentrism
- Historian's fallacy
- Moral high ground
- Whig history
- Wikipedia:Recentism

== Bibliography ==
- Fischer, David Hackett (1970). Historians' Fallacies: Toward a Logic of Historical Thought. New York: Harper Torchbooks.
- Spoerhase, Carlos (2008). "Presentism and Precursorship in Intellectual History". Culture, Theory and Critique. 49 (49). sec. 49–72. doi:10.1080/14735780802024257. S2CID 143365927.
