= Stroad =

Type of thoroughfare

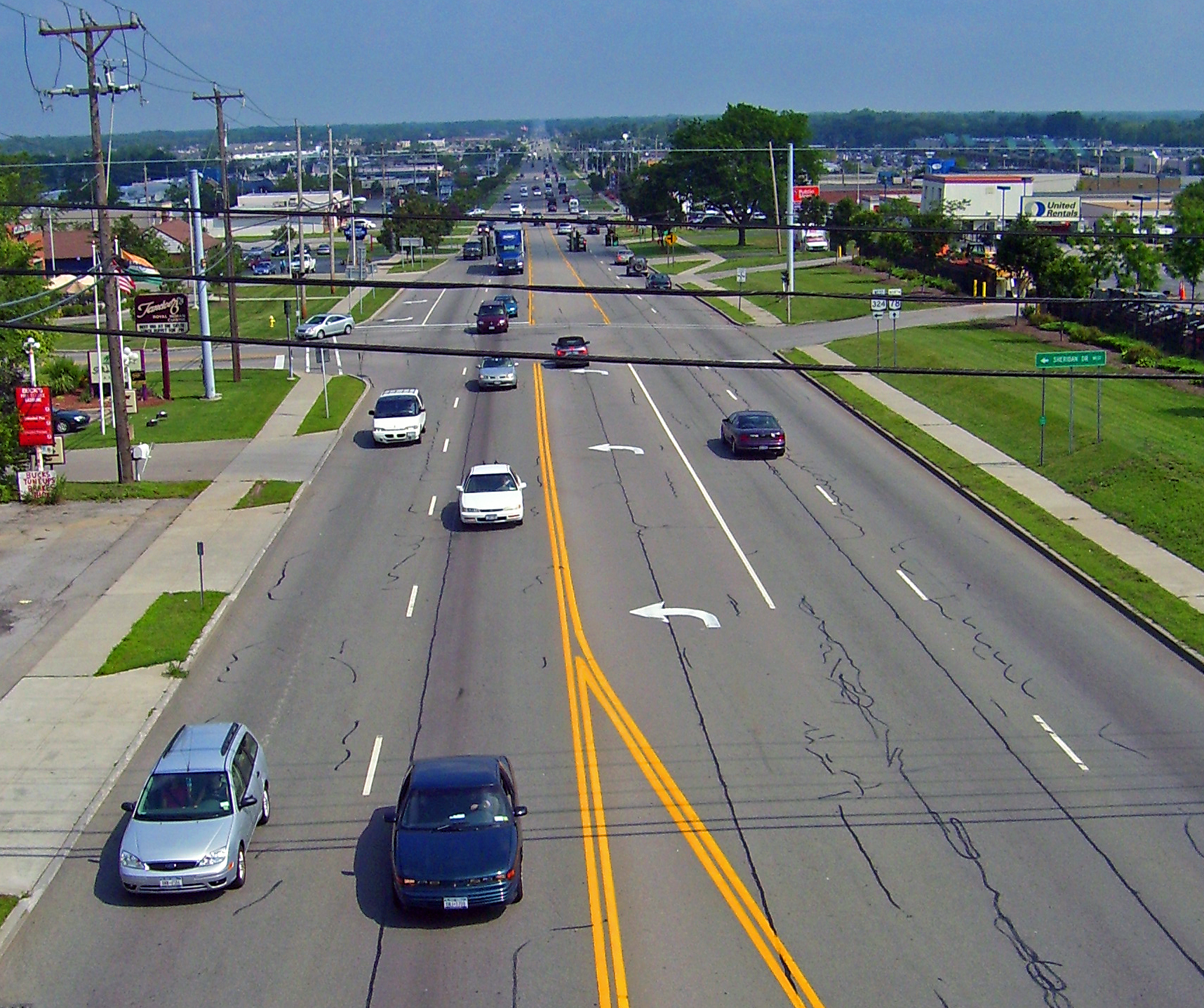
A five-lane stroad on NY 78 (Transit Road) in Amherst, New York, surrounded by auto-oriented commercial development with empty sidewalks

A stroad is a thoroughfare that combines the features of streets and roads. Common in the United States and Canada, stroads are wide arterials that also provide access to strip malls, drive-throughs, and other automobile-oriented businesses.

Stroads have been criticized by urban planners for safety issues and for inefficiencies. While streets serve as destinations and provide access to shops and residences at safe traffic speeds, roads serve as high-speed connections that efficiently move traffic at high volume, and stroads attempt to serve both purposes. Critics argue they are often an expensive, inefficient, and dangerous compromise.

== Term ==
=== Etymology ===
The word "stroad" is a portmanteau of the words street and road. It was coined in 2011 by civil engineer and urban planner Charles Marohn to describe what he considered failures in North American infrastructure development. The concept was popularized in April 2021 through a short documentary published by the urban planning YouTube channel Not Just Bikes.

=== Definition ===
A stroad is a thoroughfare which tries to serve pedestrian and vehicular traffic simultaneously, but does neither effectively. This is defined in contrast to a safely-accessible street that prioritizes pedestrians or a high-throughput road that prioritizes vehicles.

Mahron describes a street as "complex environment where life in the city happens". Streets are lined with buildings, such as houses, stores, and offices, whose entrances and exits open onto the street. As such, streets must accommodate both cars and pedestrians, through-traffic and entrances/exits from adjacent buildings, and temporary parking and delivery vehicles. As this complexity greatly increases the risk of accidents, an ideal street will have low speed limits, enforced by traffic calming features such as narrow lanes.

Conversely, Mahron describes roads as a "high-speed connection between two places". To mitigate traffic and reduce the risk of accidents, an ideal road will have limited entrances and exits, no parking, and strict segregation of vehicular and pedestrian traffic. They also have wide lanes, and are designed to run as straight as possible, only making gentle curves where necessary.

As stroads attempt to function as both a street and road, they will often combine features of both. Like a street, stroads are lined with buildings whose entrances and exits open directly onto the stroad. However, like a road, stroads permit vehicles to travel at high speeds, and will have wide lanes and be generally straight to accommodate them. In essence Marohn defines a stroad as a high-speed road with many turnoffs, and lacking in safety features.

== History ==
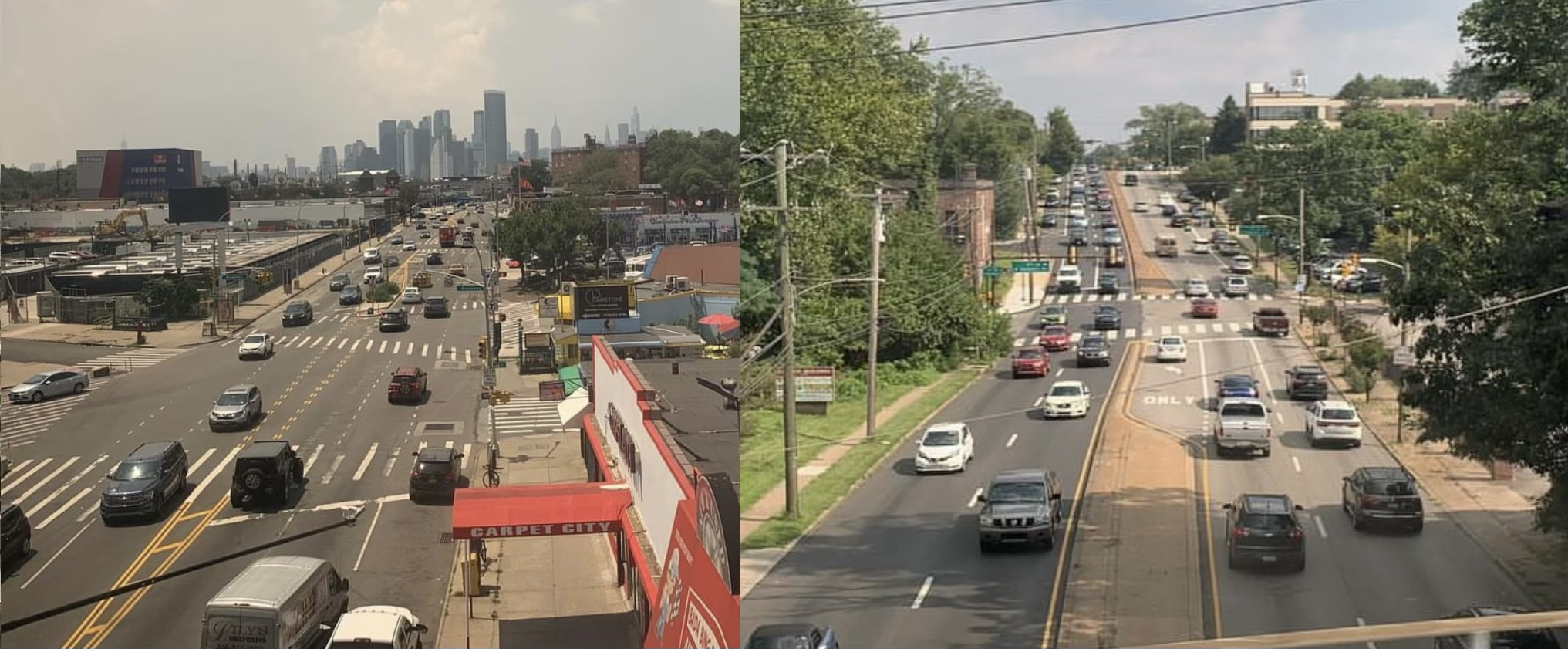
Northern Boulevard in Queens New York and Old York Road in Elkins Park Pennsylvania showing examples of an urban and suburban stroad respectively

Stroads began to emerge in the United States and Canada in the aftermath of World War II, as car ownership became widespread and suburbanization accelerated.

Some stroads were created when streets were expanded or widened, often with the aim of improving mobility. This was often done without proper access management, and under the influence of engineering codes that emphasized speed and traffic flow over safety, resulting in the street becoming a stroad. Other stroads were created when developers began adding private accessways onto roads. As the number of accessways increased, so did congestion and collisions on the road, requiring traffic control additions such as traffic signals.

Dutch urban planner Willem Zurborg argues that this conversion of streets and roads into stroads was a consequence of local governments designing their roadways to serve as flow roads, distributor roads, and access roads (i.e., streets) simultaneously. Dover and Massengale make a similar argument, noting that the general public is often not aware of the functional distinction that engineers make between streets and roads. In the English-speaking world, street names often end with 'road' and vice versa due to historical reasons; this may be misleading and not align with the current de facto traffic situation.

== Disadvantages ==
=== Safety risks ===
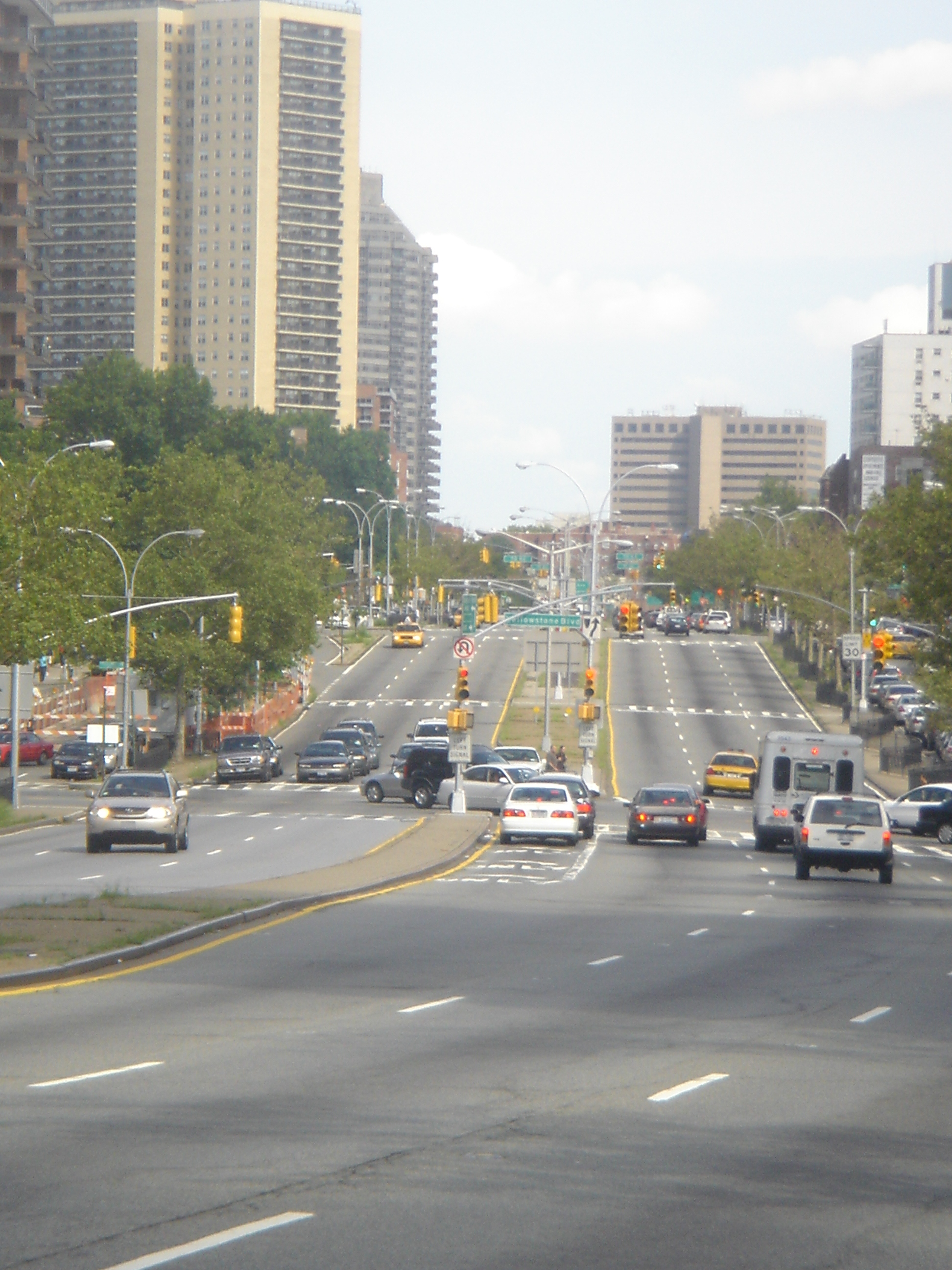
Queens Boulevard, known in New York City as the Boulevard of Broken Bones, alternatively as the Boulevard of Death, for its frequent pedestrian injuries and deaths

By combining the high speeds of roads with the complexity of streets, stroads put both pedestrians and drivers at elevated risk. A 2021 report by the Governors Highway Safety Association found that 60.4% of pedestrian fatalities from motor vehicles in the United States occurred on stroads.

==== Dangerously high speeds ====
The design of stroads encourages motorists to drive at dangerously fast speeds. Vision Zero Coalition's 2018 report explains that the wide lanes and lack of sharp turns in stroad design give drivers a false sense of safety, which subconsciously encourages them to drive at dangerously fast speeds. Stroads in the United States and Canada typically have legal speed limits between 30 and 45 miles per hour (48 and 72 km/h). But since the design speed is much higher, motorists frequently drive at up to 55 mph (89 km/h). Therefore, reducing the posted speed limit (PSL) with a traffic sign, a widely adopted strategy, will not work. "If the road [design] ... suggest[s] that the PSL is too low, drivers may simply ignore it".

This is a problem because the frequent entries and exits onto stroads create many points of conflict and potential collisions for drivers to navigate. Driving at higher speeds reduces the time drivers have to react to hazards, increasing the risk of a crash. It also means any collision will have a much higher kinetic energy, increasing its severity. (Note: 'The stroad fails at being a street. There are many driveways to businesses and homes like you'd find on a street, but mixed with multiple highway-sized lanes. This mixes high speeds with many points of conflict.' 'On a stroad, these wide highway-like designs encourage drivers to drive quickly, but combining that with traffic turning in and out of driveways and lots of four-way junctions makes this the most dangerous type of urban driving possible.')

==== Lack of protection for pedestrians ====
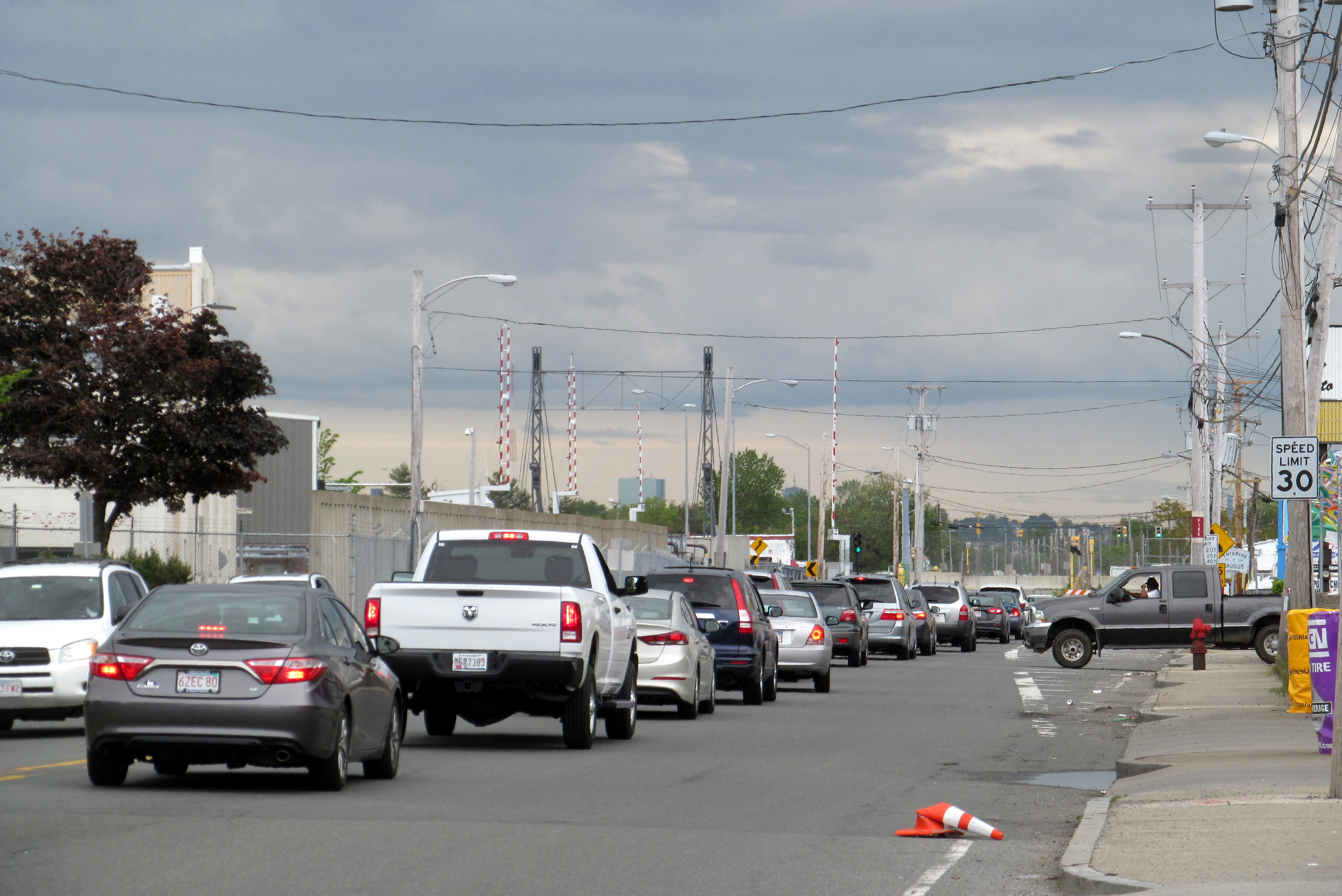
Typical sidewalk next to a stroad (Route 107 in Lynn, Massachusetts)

The quality of sidewalks next to stroads is often poor. Many stroads do not feature any sidewalks at all. In the case of stroad-like suburban residential streets, sidewalks are sometimes deliberately left out by design in order "to further the rural image". Sometimes there are only "painted sidewalks" next to a strip mall, without curbs or traffic bollards to protect pedestrians against vehicles that may deviate from the road. Stroads also often lack other pedestrian safety features, such as crosswalks and adequate street lights.

At intersecting stroads, vehicles often need to decelerate from a high to a low speed to make a sharp turn right from a long turn lane parallel to the sidewalk; this makes walking there particularly dangerous for pedestrians. Sidewalks are sometimes too narrow, feature many obstructions such as street lights, as well as driveway cuts, which make them pedestrian-unfriendly. These obstacles may force pedstrians off the sidewalk and onto the edge of the stroad, putting them at further risk.

Marohn argues that a person on a sidewalk has no defense at all if a vehicle leaves the roadway at stroad speeds. He points out that traffic lights, such as those next to the State Street stroad in Springfield, Massachusetts, are often designed with shear pins at the base so as to break off if a vehicle happens to crash into it. Although this design increases the safety of the driver and any passengers, it also significantly decreases the safety of any pedestrians who may be standing or walking on the sidewalk behind the traffic signal. Marohn was astonished to discover that a bench had been placed right next to this breakaway traffic light pole, "inviting people to sit in a place where the chance of a driver losing control and going off the roadway at high speeds is so great that the city installed breakaway poles."

=== Increased congestion ===
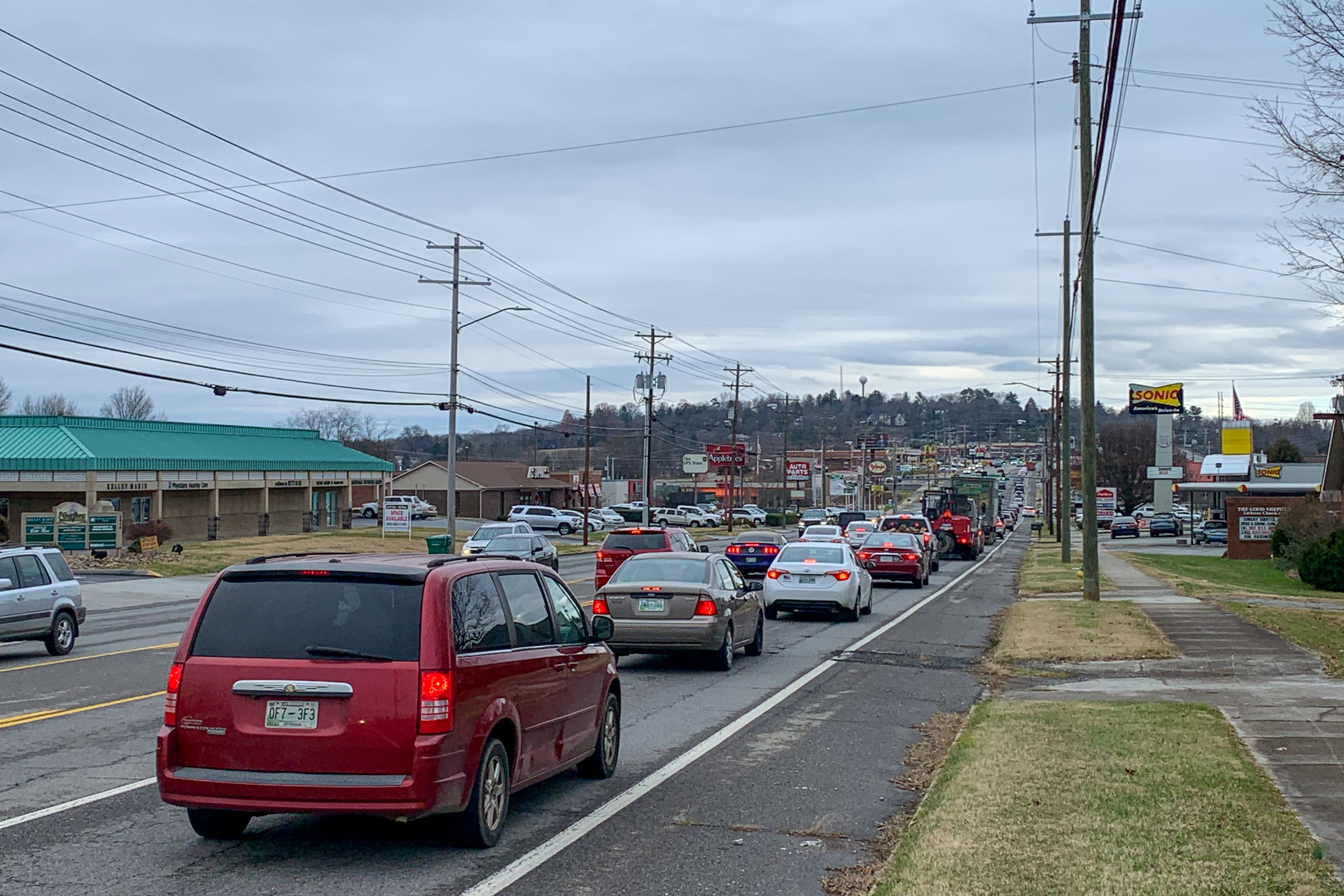
Traffic congestion on U.S. 11E in Morristown, Tennessee

Stroads are often billed as a way to make traveling by car more efficient; however, this is not always the case. Despite the high speeds that stroads were designed for, in practice they frequently end up being clogged with cars seeking access from the many entrances. As a result, the average speeds on stroads are low due to traffic congestion. Widening stroads to counter congestion usually only leads to induced demand and extra costs.

=== Low return on investment ===
==== Poor mix of street and road functions ====
In his commentary, Marohn states that stroads do not function well as either a street or a road. By trying to be "all things to all people", stroads end up failing at the functions of both.

Dover and Massengale (2014) state that the design of roads was originally modeled on the railroad, as they were intended to serve the same function: namely, providing an efficient connection between two populated places, such as cities, towns, or villages. Streets, on the other hand, formed networks within a single place to facilitate travel within their boundaries. They argue that two systems functioned well as long as they remained separate, resulting in increased financial productivity in the region they served. However, they warn that "we reconfigure our streets to have the characteristics of roads—as stroads—we are no longer able to capture the value of shar[ing] the space."

Jason Slaughter, of the urban planning YouTube channel Not Just Bikes, points out that when the Netherlands implemented clear functional distinctions between motorways (highways), roads, and streets in the 1990s, it led to increased safety, traffic flow, and cost-effectiveness, while also reducing car dependency and increasing walkability, cyclability, and overall livability. The change resulted in a 30% decrease in expected traffic deaths between 1998 and 2007. Slaughter points to this difference in outcomes to argue that North American stroads are "inefficient", as well as ugly, dangerous, and more expensive.

==== Infrastructure costs ====
Marohn (2017) stated that stroads "are enormously expensive to build and, ultimately, financially unproductive". This is because "stroads are built to a highway standard, their lanes are very wide, and there are never [fewer] than four lanes", or "at least three through lanes", and they usually take up extra space for shoulders and clear zones. Stroads feature many more entrances and exits than limited-access highways and roads and thus require more turning lanes, and because stroad vehicle speeds may be higher than on a street, the turning lanes are much longer to allow vehicles to decelerate and reduce the risk of rear-end collisions; this means stroads require more and longer turning lanes, which are more expensive to build and maintain and take up more space than streets and roads do. The high frequency of accesses to a stroad with much traffic often prompts the construction of traffic lights at intersections, which may cost up to $250,000 to build (excluding maintenance costs).

An extreme example of this is at the intersection of Charleston Boulevard and Decatur Boulevard in Las Vegas, which features seven approach lanes, each with traffic lights. The larger size of stroads compared to streets and roads means they require more space which needs to be purchased, flattened, and asphalted, which reduces the property value of the land, increases the cost of flood protection infrastructure, and adds regular asphalt and traffic control system maintenance costs. Compared to households along urban streets, stroads tend to double the costs that households pay on the construction and maintenance of infrastructure, as well as the delivery of public services, while the tax revenues per acre of properties along stroads are lower compared to urban commercial streets.

The space taken up by stroads, as well as the large areas dedicated to parking lots at the destinations of cars using stroads, result in low-density land use (typical for urban sprawl). This makes stroad environments significantly less productive and tax-generating than streets, but with significantly more infrastructure and thus higher per-area maintenance costs, so that they become a net negative and a financial burden for cities, and they cannot therefore sustain themselves.

=== Aesthetic and quality of life concerns ===
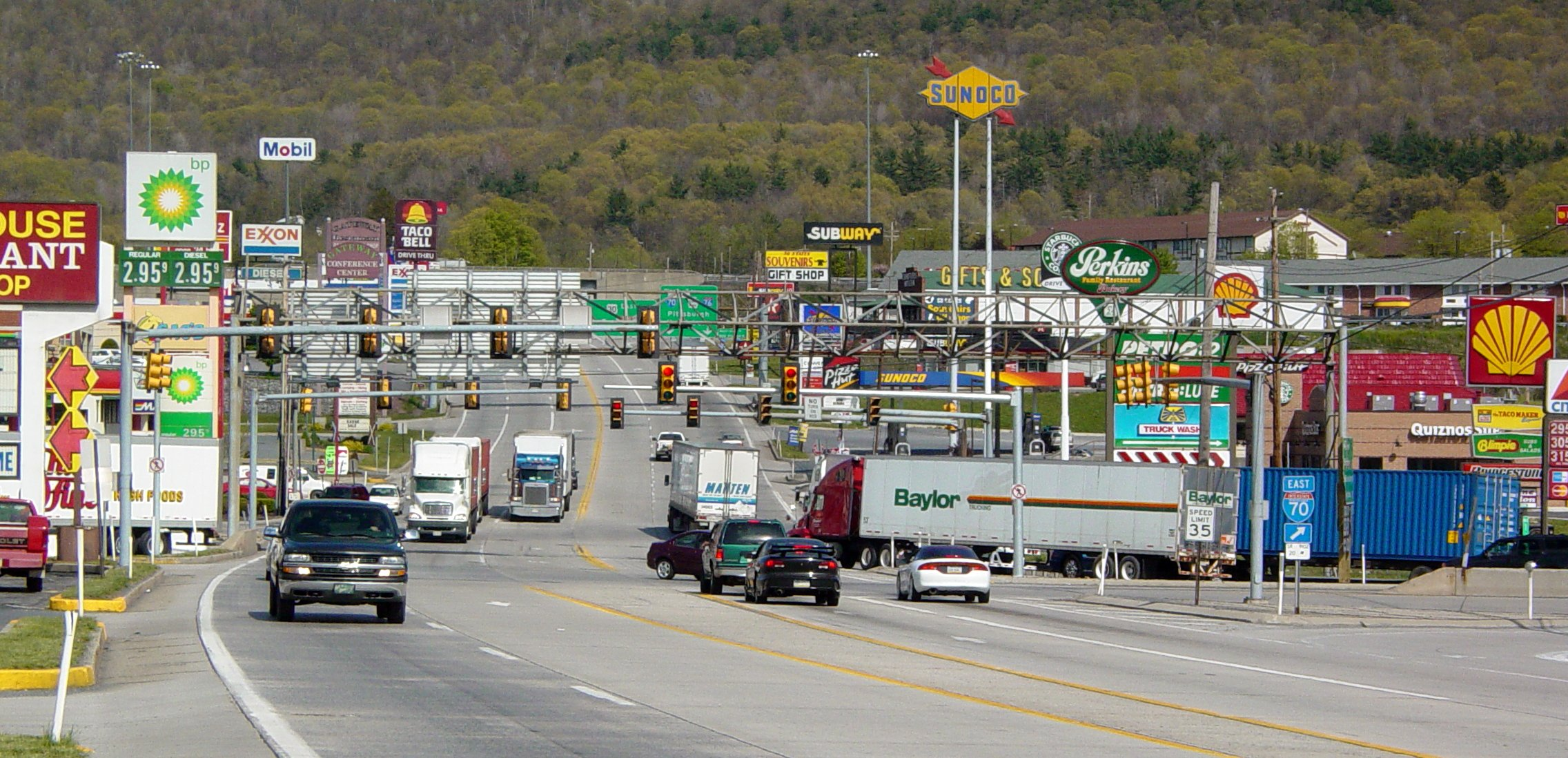
Breezewood, Pennsylvania

Stroads are frequently characterized by detractors as ugly, leading to built environments that are unpleasant to spend time in. The stroad can be found where urban sprawl and car-centric development patterns are used: it 'seems confused', and is characterized by 'no sidewalk, no shade, and a lot of parking'. Whereas stroads often feature a repetitive pattern of retail franchises on the side with very few sidewalks for pedestrians, there are usually large parking spaces for drivers. In Lexington, Kentucky, where such situations are commonly found in modern suburban commercial areas, a survey of elderly residents found that respondents instead desired 'protection from traffic, reduced noise, seating and shade, dedicated sidewalks, and increased building frontage.'

==== Car dependency ====
Stroads' lack of safety features makes them dangerous to travel on or across on foot, by bicycle, or by other modes of transportation. As such, if an area is dominated by stroads, residents will feel pressured to drive whenever possible. This is known as car dependency, and has numerous drawbacks, including increased pollution and higher infrastructure costs for local governments.

Walking for a distance of 800 metres (0.50 mi) along a stroad (Farm to Market Road 1960 or Cypress Creek Parkway) in Houston motivated Jason Slaughter of Not Just Bikes to reflect upon and criticize the design of the roadway, and explore how urban planning could be done in a more safe and efficient manner (for example, by improving walkability and reducing car dependency). The rather narrow sidewalks, and in the middle section (crossing a bridge and a railroad) no sidewalk at all, were right next to fast-driving vehicular traffic (c. 80 to 100 kilometres per hour (50 to 62 mph), creating an extremely unsafe and unpleasant environment for pedestrians. Yet, the fact that the grass where one would expect a sidewalk was well-trodden, as well as Google Street View images which also appeared to show regular use, was evidence to Slaughter that a significant number of pedestrians apparently saw or had no other option (such as taking a car, taxi or bus) than to walk along this dangerous stroad to get to their destinations without basic pedestrian protections. He argued: "There is no excuse for this. If you have enough room for 7 lanes of car traffic, then you have enough room for a sidewalk. Or a bicycle path."

== Remedies ==
To address inefficient investment and safety hazards, Charles Marohn suggested that a stroad should be converted either into a street for land access, or else into a road for mobility.

Conversion into a street would involve slowing traffic, prioritizing pedestrians over cars, and encouraging community interactions. Strategies to slow traffic entail a combination of speed limits and traffic calming measures. Calming measures include "narrower lanes, tighter corner radii, gateway treatments, changed roadway surface materials and appearance, mini roundabouts and other speed management techniques" such as speed bumps and speed cameras.

Conversion into a road would involve separating the road from shops and reducing the number of access roads. This reduces congestion and permits faster vehicular travel.

Since the late 2010s, traffic engineers in North America cities such as Boston, Houston, and St. Louis have tried to redesign streets and rework traffic laws to prioritize safety. As of 2019, the city of Boston is studying how to minimize pedestrian traffic deaths by lowering speed limits with traffic calming using road diets. After several stroads were replaced by more efficient roadways in Boston, vehicular fatalities fell from 21 in 2016 to 10 in 2018; simultaneously, pedestrian fatalities halved from 14 to 7. This partial success motivated Bostonian locals to demand the complete elimination of the remaining stroads by implementing better road design.

== Examples ==
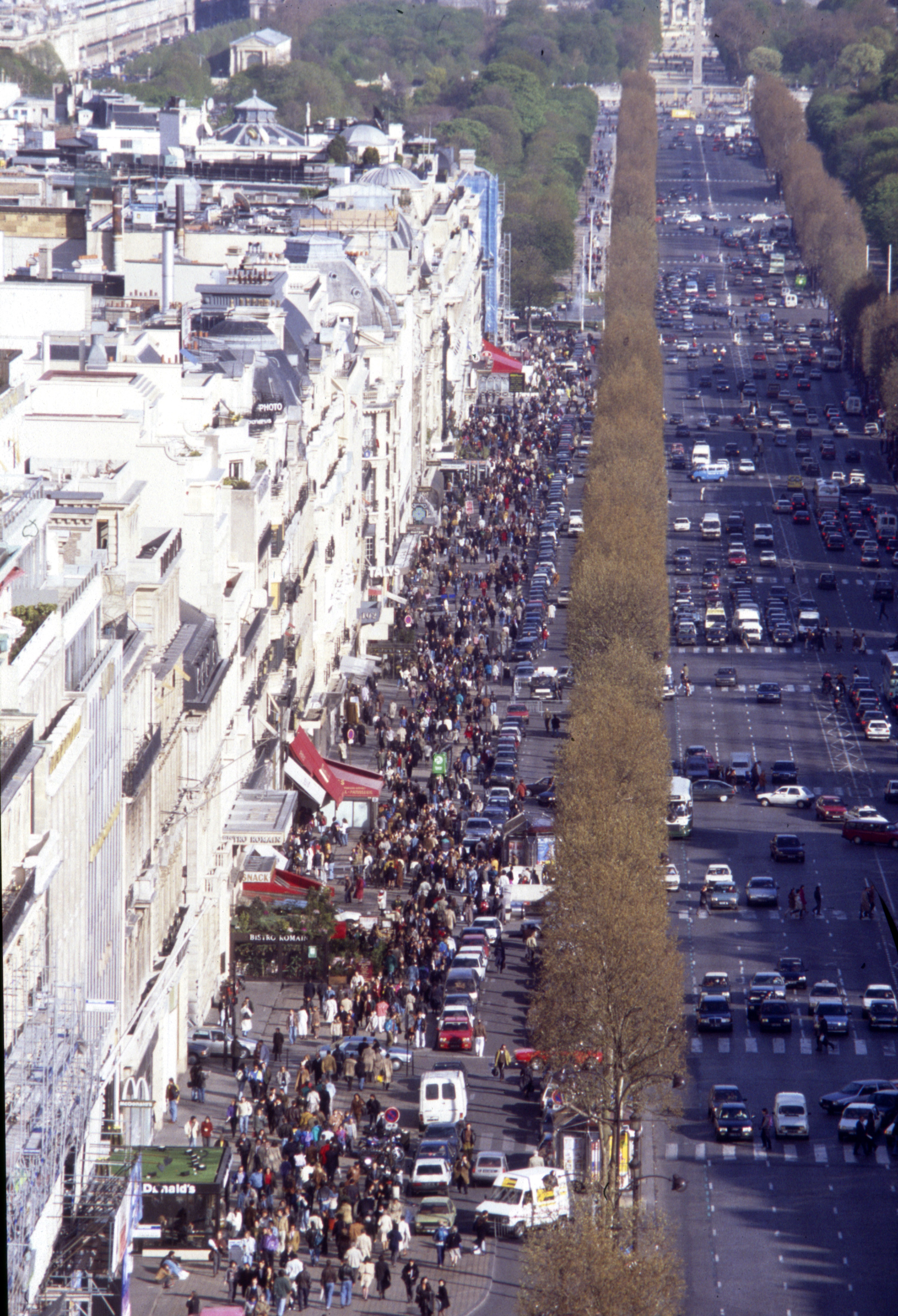
Champs-Élysées 1991: road and streets separated

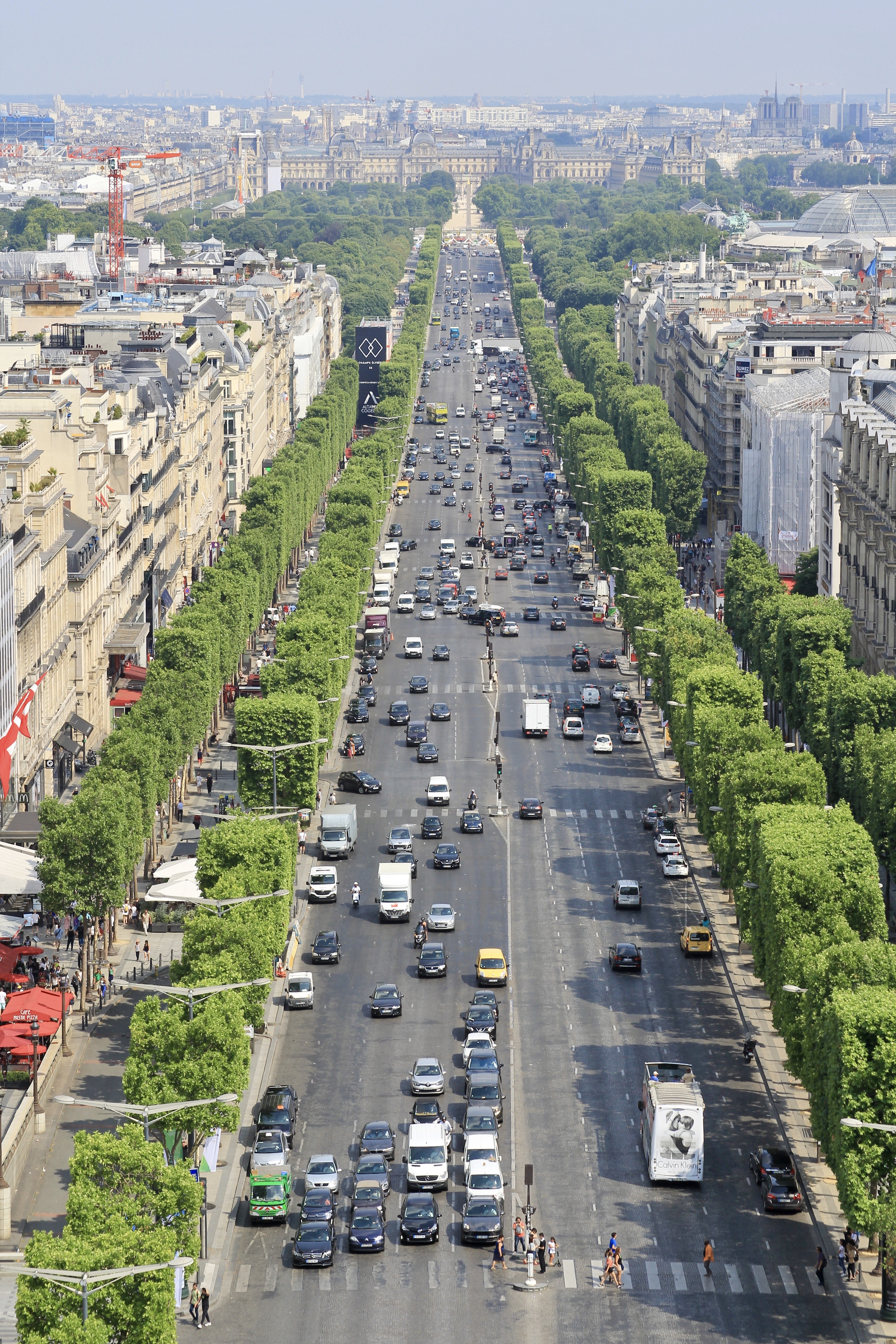
Champs-Élysées 2017: sides pedestrianized

According to Charles Marohn, the famous Champs-Élysées in Paris was effectively a stroad as recently as 2001. In the middle of the avenue were three automobile traffic lanes in either direction, ostensibly fulfilling the function of a road. A wide buffer of trees lined both sides of the road, separating the roadway from slip lanes for slow-moving traffic. These slip lanes fulfilled the function of streets, providing access to parking, sidewalks, shops and restaurants. Because the street and road areas of the Champs-Élysées were physically separated, this stroad environment achieved some success, allowing both safe, high-speed traffic (up to 45 miles per hour (72 km/h)) in the center roadway and a productive street environment on the sides. As of 2019, the slip lanes are fully pedestrianized, while the center roadway functions as a true road.

The Esplanade in Chico, California is, according to Marohn, a rare example of a successful 'stroad' akin to the 2001 version of the Parisian Champs-Élysées in that buffers of trees physically separate the high-speed 'road' part in the middle from the two low-speed productive 'streets' on the sides (lined by houses which had high property values). He contrasted the Esplanade to Mangrove Avenue, a stroad just five blocks to the east in Chico that runs parallel to the Esplanade, but which he claims has the typical issues of a stroad, in that the street and road functions are not physically separated, and the environment is low-density and much less productive, with gas stations, strip malls and other car-oriented businesses.

Unlike Marohn, however, Jason Slaughter of Not Just Bikes does not categorize such traffic situations as a "stroad", but as "a road with streets on either side to access houses". Taking the Nieuwe Dedemsvaartweg (Provincial road N377) outside Nieuwleusen and the Keizer Karelweg (s108) in Amstelveen in the Netherlands as examples, he used the fact that access from the middle to the sides is very restricted (through a limited number of roundabouts) to argue that they are three separate ways: the middle is a road, the sides are streets; there is no "stroad". (Note: '...a road outside of the town of Nieuwleusen. This road [Provincial road N377] is designed to move vehicles, so there is no direct access to adjacent properties. The homes and businesses are accessed by streets on the right and left side, and the road is mostly accessed by roundabout.' As a matter of fact, the middle road is named 'Nieuwe Dedemsvaartweg', while the northern parallel street is named 'Den Hulst', and the southern parallel street is named 'Rollecate', so they are officially considered separate entities.) (Note: 'Here [on the Keizer Karelweg in Amstelveen], there are several houses, but instead of being accessed directly, as they would be on a stroad, they're accessible by a two-way side street, which was made purposefully narrow to slow down drivers. This also provides a safe alternative for people cycling. The road itself is only two lanes for car traffic, with a turning lane when necessary.' Although both the road and the side street are named 'Keizer Karelweg', only the road has the 's108' ontsluitingsweg designation ('s' stands for 'stadsroute', see s108 (Amsterdam) and Amsterdam stadsroutes).)

=== Canada ===
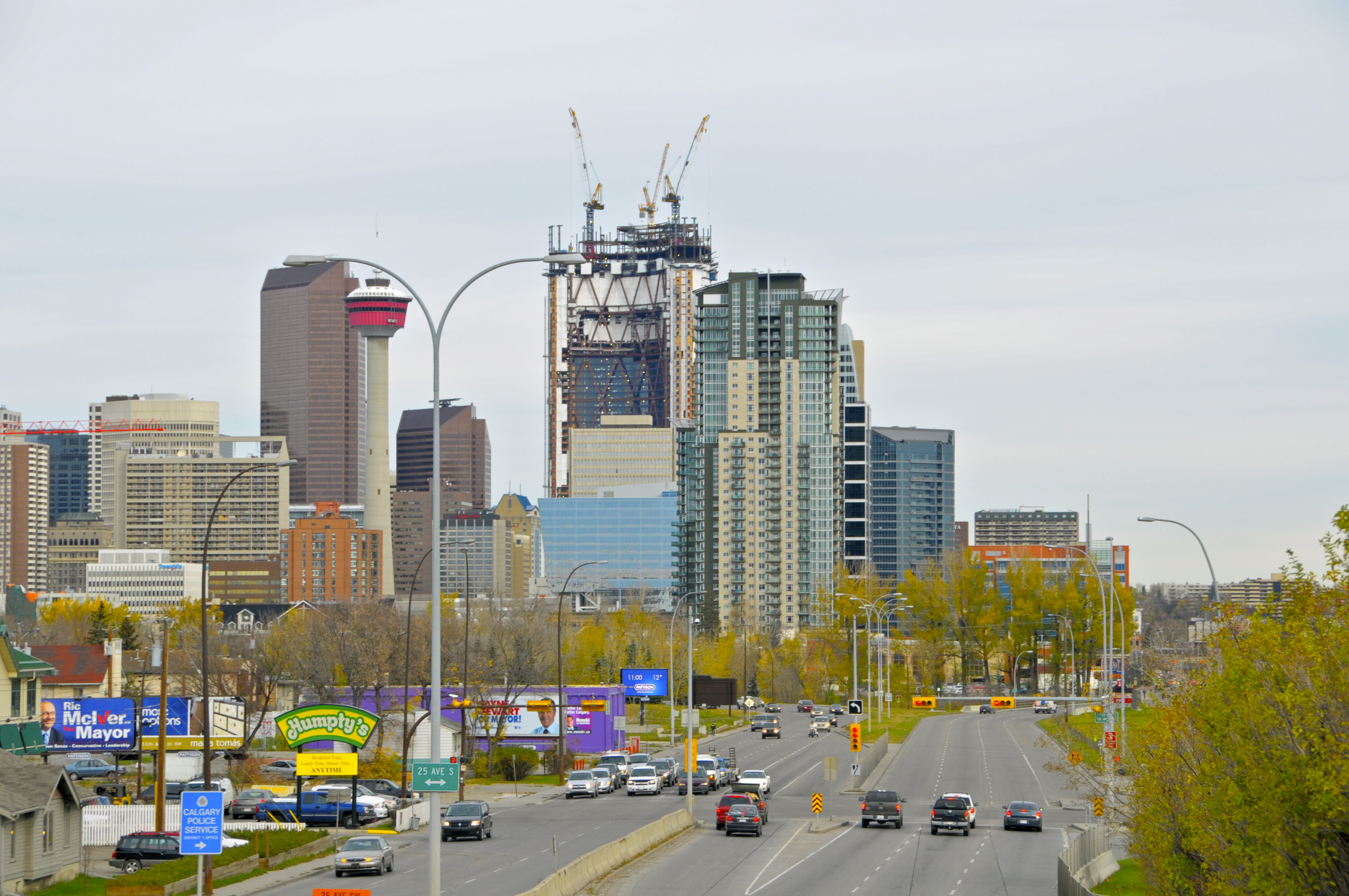
Macleod Trail, just south of the Elbow River in Calgary

- Wonderland Road in London, Ontario, has been identified as a five-lane stroad by Jason Slaughter of Not Just Bikes, who grew up next to it. The city council considered widening Wonderland Road to seven lanes in an attempt to alleviate congestion, but in 2021 it voted 9 to 5 against the plan, because the council majority reasoned that it would only lead to induced demand, 212 million Canadian dollars in construction costs, higher maintenance costs, and a significantly higher environmental impact, without actually solving the congestion problem.
- Macleod Trail between Calgary and Fort Macleod in the Canadian province of Alberta, particularly the stretch between the Elbow River and 90 Avenue SE, has been identified as a stroad by Tom Babin ("Shifter"). One of the most significant characteristics of this stretch is that this "stroad" part has a rather poor safety record, because it has some of the highest collision rates in the city of Calgary, while at the Macleod Trail part to the north closer to downtown (where it is more like a "street"), as well as the part further to the south (where it is more like a "road"), there were far fewer crashes by comparison.
- Main Street in Old Ottawa East was redeveloped over two years to remove a lane of traffic to make room for wider sidewalks and bike paths. It reopened in 2017 and businesses reported increased foot traffic.

=== United States ===
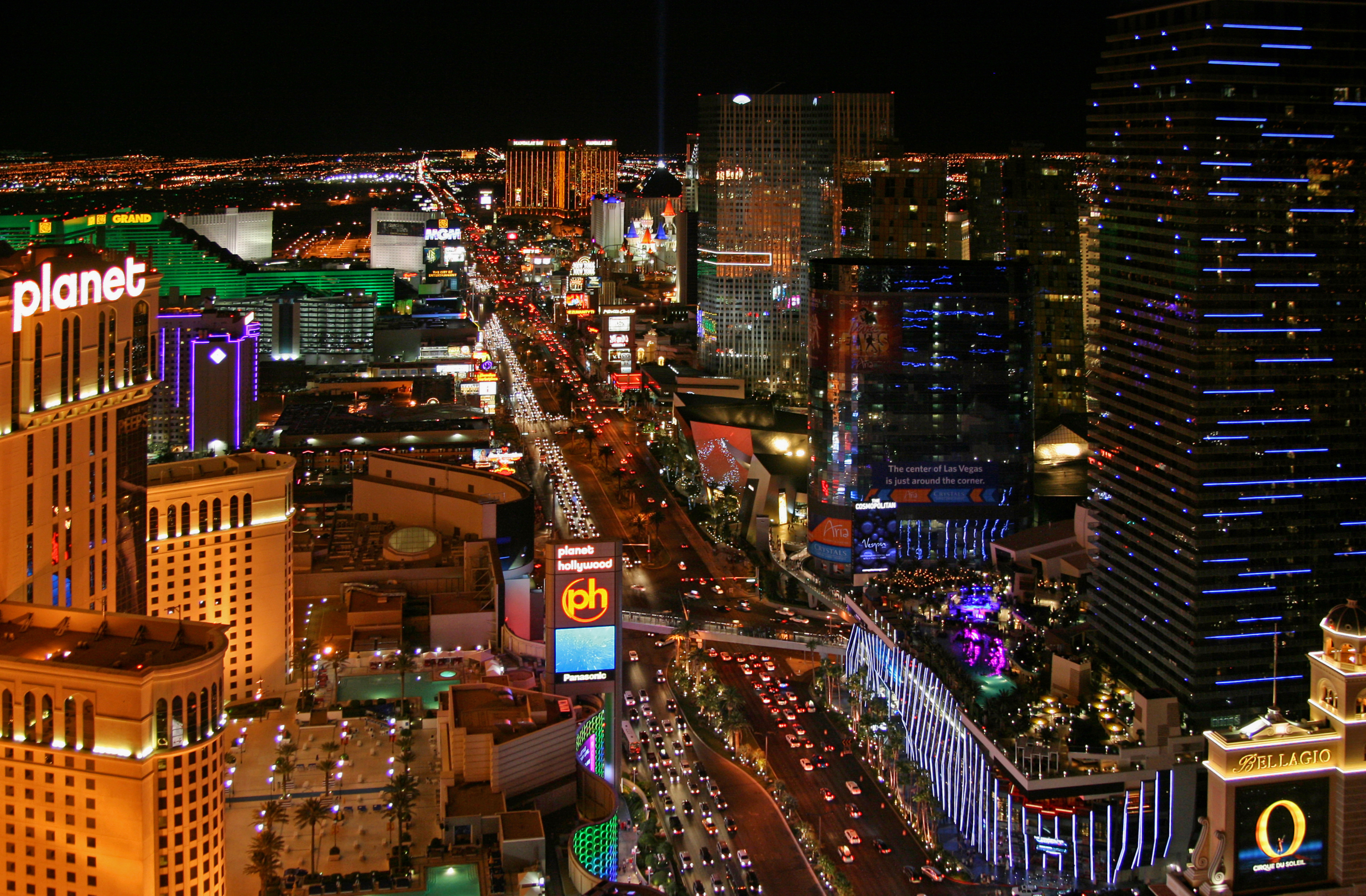
The Las Vegas Strip, an infamously clogged stroad, viewed from above at night

- California State Route 82, part of El Camino Real, has been characterized as a 43-mile-long stroad between San Francisco and San Jose.
- Charleston Boulevard, part of the Nevada State Route 159 in Clark County, Nevada, is a stroad in Las Vegas. It has at least three through lanes at every point along its length, large intersections such as with Decatur Boulevard (another stroad) and the Interstate 15 (Las Vegas Freeway) where Charleston Boulevard has seven approach lanes, and long right-turn lanes (intended to allow vehicles to decelerate from over 50 miles per hour (80 km/h) to safely make a sharp turn right) that make walking on the sidewalk particularly dangerous for pedestrians. Pedestrian crossings (crosswalks) over or parallel to Charleston Boulevard tend to be quite long and unsafe, while sidewalks tend to be narrow, feature many obstructions such as street lights, as well as driveway cuts, which make them pedestrian-unfriendly.
- Georgia State Route 13, also known as the Buford Highway and the Atlanta Highway, is a stroad north of Atlanta, Georgia. The Buford Highway community along this stroad, which features many strip malls, is home to a diverse immigrant community where car ownership is low, and the pedestrian fatality rates are amongst the highest in the state of Georgia. As of 2021, the Atlanta-based Canvas Planning Group urban community planning and designing consulting firm is co-operating with the local non-profit organisation We Love BuHi to construct 'additional, safer, and more pleasant walking routes by connecting the walkways in front of the many strip malls with painted sidewalks'.
- Illinois Route 59 in metropolitan Chicago's DuPage County is a stroad with traffic moving at an average of 50 miles per hour (80 km/h), and a repetitive pattern of retail franchises on the side, with very few sidewalks for pedestrians, but large parking spaces for drivers.
- Lancaster Avenue in Bryn Mawr, Pennsylvania, has been identified as a stroad, because it is a street designed like a road with expensive infrastructure, low return on investment, and unsafe traffic conditions for both drivers, cyclists, and pedestrians.
- The Las Vegas Strip is an infamously clogged stroad in Clark County, Nevada, that forms part of the Las Vegas Boulevard (part of Nevada State Route 604). According to Ray Delahanty (From the YouTube channel 'CityNerd'), the Las Vegas Strip "is the ultimate stroad", and the word "strip" was a commonly used term to describe "stroads" before Marohn coined the latter term with a specific definition.

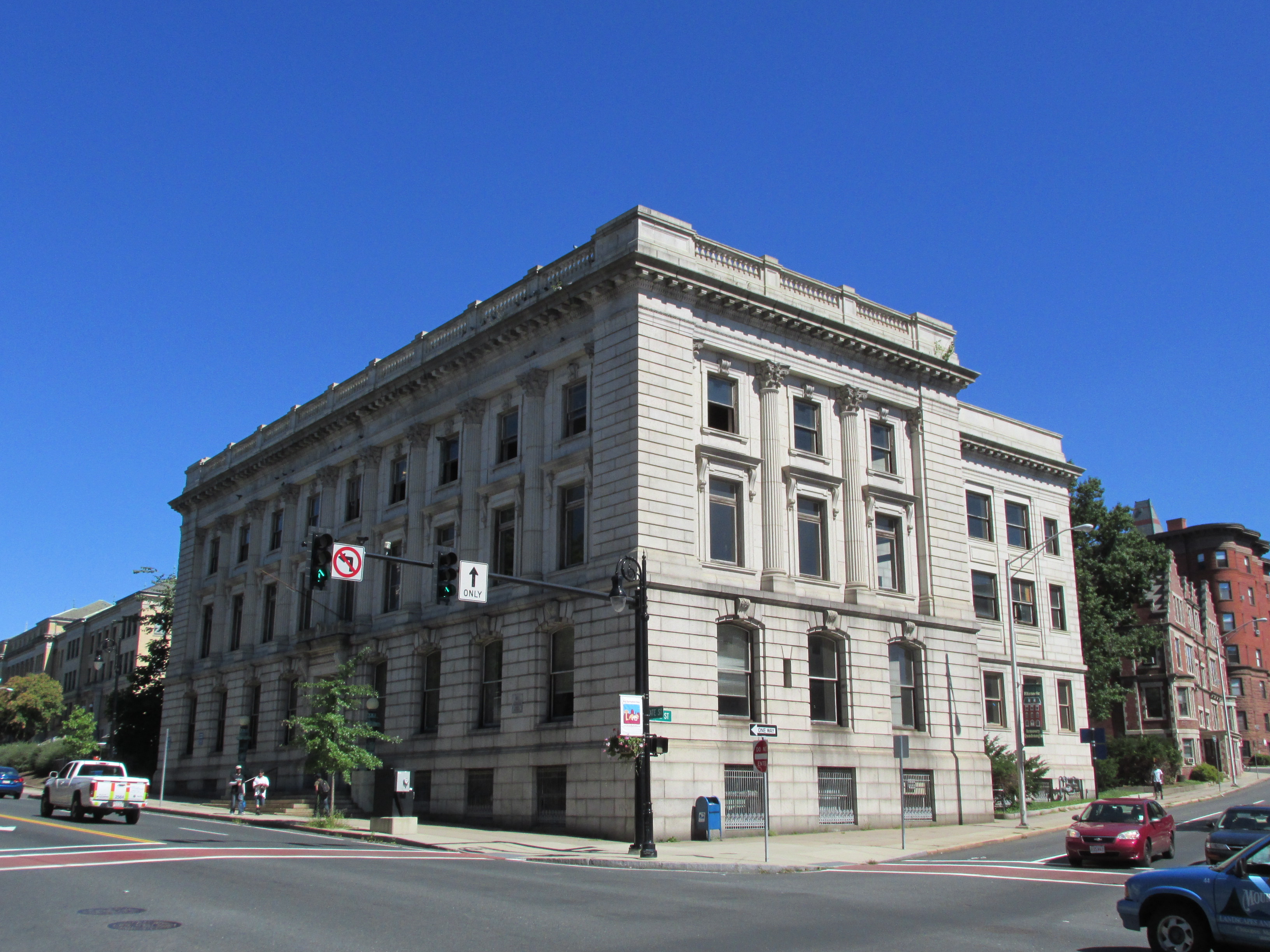
State Street in Springfield, Massachusetts

- Linn County, Iowa has several stroads, with "Corridor Urbanism" co-founders Bruce Nesmith and Ben Kaplan (2021) pointing to Collins Road, Edgewood Road and Williams Boulevard in Cedar Rapids, as well as Highway 151, Highway 13, Linnview Avenue, Eagleview Drive, Highway 100, East Post Road, Menards Lane, and Seventh Avenue in Marion. They criticized Marion City Council's decision to invest in red light cameras at six intersections of the aforementioned stroads in Marion, while statistics had identified red light running as the cause of only 46 out of all 347 crashes (13.3%) in the previous six years, arguing that redesigning the roads would be a far better solution.
- State Street in Springfield, Massachusetts, has been identified as a stroad by Charles Marohn (2021) in a case study involving the death of a seven-year-old girl and the serious injury of her mother and eight-year-old cousin after they were hit by a car on State Street next to the Central Library on December 3, 2014. (Note: Marohn dedicated his 2021 book to the 7-year-old girl who died, and her family's grief, as well as the car driver's conscience: "This book is dedicated to the memory of Destiny Gonzalez and all whose lives have been cut short by America's transportation system, and to Sagrario Gonzalez, her husband, Luis, and all who have suffered great loss on our nation's roads and streets, and to Sandra Zemtsova, along with everyone who must live knowing that others did not. May this book reduce your pain.") Marohn stated: 'While many engineers have tried, it is impossible to make a stroad safe. State Street in Springfield has one of the highest crash rates in the state of Massachusetts. The only way to improve safety on a stroad is to convert it into a street or a road.'
- Fruitville Road in Sarasota, Florida. In downtown, this stroad is four-lanes before widening to six lanes as it continues east before reverting back to four lanes after the junction with Interstate 75. The road has been subject to traffic signal-induced congestion and frequent incidents of reckless driving.

=== Other countries ===
- Deagon, Queensland's two main avenues – Sandgate Road / Braun Street (south-north) and Board Street / Depot Road (east-west) – serving as immediate arterial links to the Gateway Motorway, have been identified as 'typical stroads'.
- Thailand Highway 3214, described by author Korawich Kavee as a stroad.

== See also ==
- Arterial road
- Collector road
- Intersection (road)
- Mobility transition
- Ring road
- Road hierarchy
- Road traffic safety § Designing for pedestrians and cyclists
- Roundabout

== Bibliography ==
- Dover, Victor; Massengale, John (2014). Street Design: The Secret to Great Cities and Towns. Hoboken, New Jersey: John Wiley & Sons. p. 416. ISBN 978-1-118-06670-6.
- Marohn, Charles (2021). Confessions of a Recovering Engineer: Transportation for a Strong Town. Hoboken, New Jersey: John Wiley & Sons. p. 272. ISBN 978-1-119-69925-5.
- Middleton, Sadie R. (2021). "Why Won't Grandma Cross the Road? Neighborhood perceptions and walking behavior among older adults in Lexington, Kentucky". Theses and Dissertations – Urban and Environmental Design. 1. University of Kentucky: 61. doi:10.13023/etd.2021.208.
- Slaughter, Jason (April 26, 2021). The Ugly, Dangerous, and Inefficient Stroads found all over the US & Canada [ST05]. Not Just Bikes – via YouTube.
- Tranter, Paul; Tolley, Rodney (2020). Slow Cities: Conquering our Speed Addiction for Health and Sustainability. Amsterdam: Elsevier. pp. 253–255. ISBN 978-0-12-815317-8.
- Williamson, June; Dunham-Jones, Ellen (2021). Case Studies in Retrofitting Suburbia: Urban Design Strategies for Urgent Challenges. Hoboken, New Jersey: John Wiley & Sons. p. 272. ISBN 978-1-119-14917-0.
- Zurborg, William J. (2023). "Completing Streets: Improving America's "Complete Streets"". William & Mary Environmental Law and Policy Review. 47 (2). William & Mary Law School: 466–488.
