= Strong Towns =

American nonprofit organization

- Formation: November 2009; 16 years ago
- Legal status: 501(c)3 nonprofit
- Headquarters: Brainerd, Minnesota
- Location: United States
- Founder and President: Charles Marohn
- Website: strongtowns.org

Strong Towns is an American nonprofit organization dedicated to helping cities and towns in the United States and Canada achieve financial resiliency through civic engagement. The advocacy group points to American post-World War II suburban development as a ponzi scheme that will not be able to cover its maintenance costs in the long-run and seeks to improve communities through urban planning concepts such as walkability, mixed-use zoning, and infill development. According to Strong Towns, the group seeks to end highway expansion; encourages localities to use transparent accounting practices in showing the financial impacts of infrastructure, especially suburban infrastructure; build incremental housing; build safe, productive, and human-oriented streets; and end parking mandates and subsidies.

== History ==
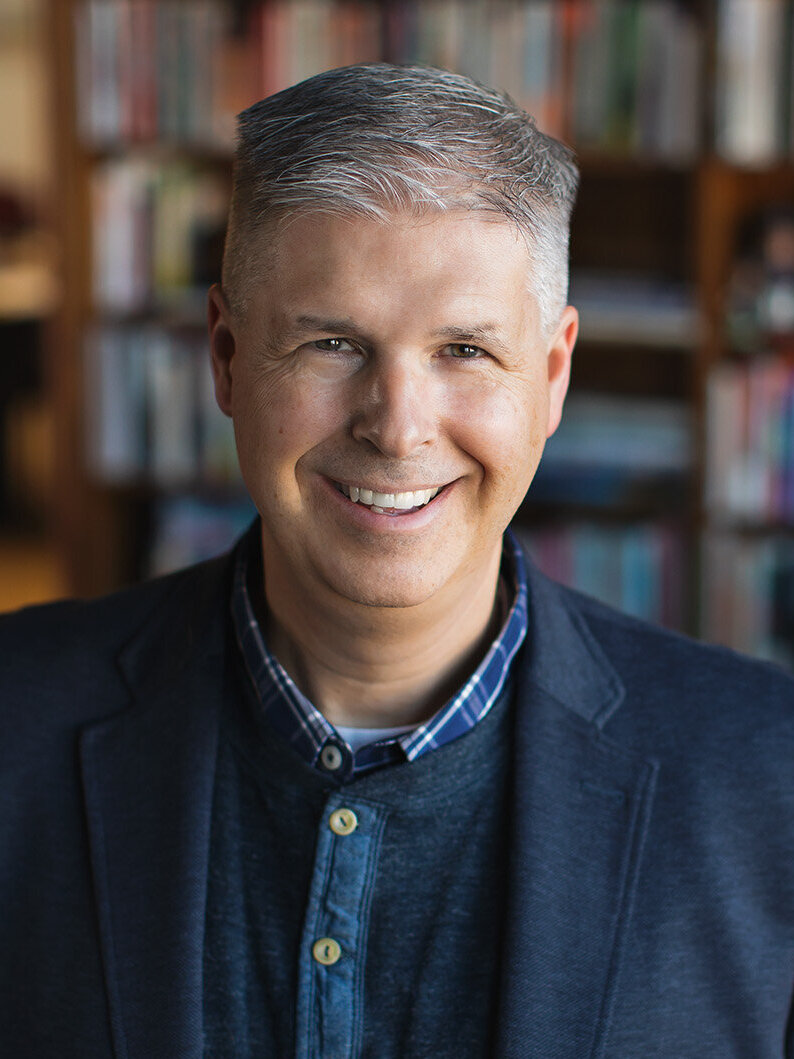
Charles Marohn, founder of Strong Towns

The organization was founded by Charles Marohn. Marohn is a former professional engineer and city planner, and the organization is headquartered in his hometown of Brainerd, Minnesota.

Prior to Strong Towns, Marohn started the Community Growth Institute, his own planning firm, in the early 2000s. Marohn often felt that the cities his firm was collaborating with were becoming overbuilt and could be heading towards financial problems in the long run. Frustrated at officials in these cities resisting change, and due to the 2008 financial crisis, Marohn started a "The Planner Blog" to bring attention to these concerns.

The name Strong Towns was chosen by Jon Commers, an associate of Marohn's. Marohn's blog was subsequently renamed to the Strong Towns blog, and in November 2009 the Strong Towns organization was officially launched by Marohn, Commers and Ben Oleson, a former business partner of Marohn's from the Community Growth Institute.

The Strong Towns 2024 annual report reported 5,700 members, primarily from the US and Canada.

Strong Towns also supports Local Conversations, which are groups of people that work together to build community and improve their neighborhoods. Local Conversations hope to facilitate places that combat loneliness. As of September 2026, Strong Towns has 290 groups with local leadership across the country.

== See also ==
- Incremental Development Alliance
