= Appeal to novelty =

Fallacy in which validity is determined based on novelty

The appeal to novelty (also called appeal to modernity or argumentum ad novitatem) is a logical fallacy in which one prematurely claims that an idea or proposal is correct or superior, exclusively because it is new and modern. In a controversy between status quo and new inventions, an appeal to novelty argument is not in itself a valid argument. The fallacy may take two forms: overestimating the new and modern, prematurely and without investigation assuming it to be best-case, or underestimating status quo, prematurely and without investigation assuming it to be worst-case.

Investigation may prove these claims to be true, but it is a fallacy to prematurely conclude this only from the general claim that all novelty is good.

Chronological snobbery is a form of appeal to novelty, in which one argues that the only relevant knowledge and practices are those established in the last decades. The opposite of an appeal to novelty is an appeal to tradition, in which one argues that the "old ways" are always superior to new ideas.

Appeals to novelty are often successful in a modern world where everyone is eager to be on the "cutting edge" of technology. The dot-com bubble of the early 2000s could easily be interpreted as a sign of the dangers of naïvely embracing new ideas without first viewing them with a critical eye. Also, advertisers frequently extoll the newness of their products as a reason to buy. Conversely, this is satirised by skeptics as bleeding edge technology, which may itself be an example of an appeal to tradition.

== Explanation ==
The appeal to novelty is based on the reasoning that in general people will tend to try to improve the outputs resulting from their efforts. Thus, for example, a company producing a product might be assumed to know about existing flaws and to be seeking to correct them in a future revision. This line of reasoning is obviously flawed for many reasons, most notably that it ignores:

- motive (a new product may be released that is functionally identical to previous products but which is cheaper to produce, or with modifications that have nothing to do with its core use, e.g. aesthetic modifications on a technological product);
- cyclicality (the fashion industry continually rediscovers old styles and markets them as the next new thing);
- population dynamics (the previous product may have been created by an expert who has since been replaced by a neophyte);
- fallibility (while building the new product defects or negative side effects can be introduced undetected, effectively rendering it inferior);
- difference between local and general improvement (a new product may be superior to its previous counterpart in its core function but made lacking in other aspects, leading to a general inferior state, e.g. a product dropping some features, or becoming restricted geographically);
- cost (the new product may be better in terms of performance but have low or no return on investment if used to replace the older one).

== Examples ==
- "If you want to lose weight, your best bet is to follow the latest diet."
- "The department will become more profitable because it has been reorganized."
- "Upgrading all your software to the most recent versions will make your system more reliable."
- "Things are bad with party A in charge, thus party B will bring an improvement if they're elected."
- "If you want to make friends, you have to wear the latest fashion and the trendiest gadgets."
- "Do X because it is (current year)."
- "You believe in X and actually believe that he did X in the 21st Century?"

== See also ==
- Fear of missing out (FOMO)
- Historian's fallacy
- Myth of progress
- Novelty bias
- Shiny object syndrome
