= Chronological snobbery =

View of past as inferior to the present

Chronological snobbery is an argument that the thinking, art, or science of an earlier time is inherently inferior to that of the present, simply by virtue of its temporal priority or the belief that since civilization has advanced in certain areas, people of earlier periods were less intelligent. The term was coined by C. S. Lewis and Owen Barfield, and first mentioned by Lewis in his 1955 autobiographical work, Surprised by Joy. Chronological snobbery is a form of appeal to novelty.

== Explanation ==
As Barfield explains it, it is the belief that "intellectually, humanity languished for countless generations in the most childish errors on all sorts of crucial subjects, until it was redeemed by some simple scientific dictum of the last century." The subject came up between them when Barfield had converted to Anthroposophy and was seeking to get Lewis (an atheist at the time) to join him. One of Lewis's objections was that religion was simply outdated, and in Surprised by Joy (chapter 13, pp. 207–208), he describes how this was fallacious:

Barfield never made me an Anthroposophist, but his counterattacks destroyed forever two elements in my own thought. In the first place he made short work of what I have called my "chronological snobbery," the uncritical acceptance of the intellectual climate common to our own age and the assumption that whatever has gone out of date is on that account discredited. You must find why it went out of date. Was it ever refuted (and if so by whom, where, and how conclusively) or did it merely die away as fashions do? If the latter, this tells us nothing about its truth or falsehood. From seeing this, one passes to the realization that our own age is also "a period," and certainly has, like all periods, its own characteristic illusions. They are likeliest to lurk in those widespread assumptions which are so ingrained in the age that no one dares to attack or feels it necessary to defend them.

A manifestation of chronological snobbery is the usage in general of the word "medieval" to mean "backwards".

== See also ==
- Declinism
- Genetic fallacy
- Historian's fallacy
- Myth of progress
- Presentism (historical analysis)
- Whig history
- Dark Ages (historiography)
