= Environmental Law and Policy Center =

US non-profit organization

- Founded: 1993
- Founder: Howard A. Learner
- Purpose: Environmentalism
- Location: Chicago
- Region served: Midwest U.S.
- Method: Litigation, Advocacy
- Revenue: US$6 million
- Employees: Approx. 40
- Website: elpc.org

The Environmental Law and Policy Center (ELPC) is a Midwest-based environmental nonprofit advocacy group, with offices in Chicago, Columbus (Ohio), Des Moines (Iowa), Duluth (Minnesota), Jamestown (North Dakota), Madison (Wisconsin), Sioux Falls (South Dakota), and Washington, D.C. ELPC's mission is to advance environmental progress and economic development together throughout the Midwest through projects that advance clean energy, clean air, clean water and clean transportation.

ELPC was founded in 1993, and today has a staff of more than 40 public interest attorneys, public policy analysts, scientists, finance specialists, and media experts. ELPC's annual revenues of about $6 million are raised from more than 160 foundation and individual major donors, as well as members across the Midwest and United States.

== About ==
ELPC was founded in 1993 by Howard A. Learner, a public-interest attorney, after a year-long strategic planning process sponsored by seven major foundations.

The organization advocates for improved policies and policy implementation at the federal, state and local levels related to renewable energy, energy efficiency, clean air, clean water and smart transportation. Attorneys who work for the organization represent local grassroots organization in litigation related to the Clean Water Act, Clean Air Act and other major pieces of national environmental legislation before federal and state courts as well as state and local administrative bodies. The organization states that its attorneys and policy advocates work on multi-disciplinary teams alongside scientists, finance specialists, media experts and others.

The organization's governing leadership includes a Board of Directors, Science Advisory Council, Next Generation Advisory Council and state-based advisory councils in Iowa, Michigan and South Dakota. Members of the Board and Advisory Councils include individuals from legal, civic, business and non-profit sectors.

== Programs ==
ELPC runs a number of environmental advocacy programs:

- Climate Change Solutions: ELPC aims to transform the Midwest region into a center for climate solutions that address the two most prominent sources of carbon pollution—energy generation and transportation. This work spans the organization's other program areas related to Clean Air, Clean Energy, and Clean Transportation.
- Clean Energy: ELPC works to create policies that drive markets for clean energy to succeed. This includes creating markets for wind and solar energy, designing energy efficiency programs and policies, promoting farm energy, and advancing transmission policies that support clean energy.
- Clean Air: ELPC works to clean up or shut down old, dirty coal plants, often providing free legal assistance to local grassroots organizations.
- Clean Water: ELPC works in Midwest states to make sure the Clean Water Act is implemented and enforced well, often providing free legal assistance to local grassroots organizations.
- Clean Transportation: ELPC works to advance the Midwest High-Speed Rail Network, create a market for cleaner cars, and oppose wasteful highway spending.
- Special Places: ELPC works with grassroots groups throughout the Midwest to protect the region's most precious natural treasures, including places like the Driftless Area, Great Lakes, Saugatuck Dunes, Mississippi River, and North Woods.

== Political activity ==
Impacts claimed by the ELPC include:

1994

- In 1994, the EPLC's lobbying efforts helped prevent the construction of the planned I-69 highway in Indiana.
- Leveraged our intervention in the Cinergy merger between two Indiana and Ohio utilities to negotiate a major new five-year energy efficiency initiative.

1995

- Co-founded and lead the market-driven Chicagoland Recycled Paper Coalition with the Bank of America, Chicago Mercantile Exchange, City of Chicago, Commonwealth Edison and RR Donnelley & Sons Co.

1996

- Took legal action to force activation of Minnesota's environmental externalities statute that establishes environmental values, including carbon dioxide costs, to be used in utilities’ electricity resource planning.

1997

- Took legal action requiring the Illinois State Toll Highway Authority to consider greener alternatives to the proposed I-355 toll road extension in Will County.
- The EPLC intervened in the "Primergy" merger of two Minnesota and Wisconsin utilities.

1998

- Prevented construction of a prison along a sand prairie habitat along the Mississippi River.
- Took action to shut down the Zion 1 & 2 nuclear plants, the largest nuclear plant closures in the nation.

2000

- Stopped Detroit Edison's attempt to restart the Connors Creek coal plant in Detroit and pushed its conversion to relatively greener natural gas.
- Obtained changes in company policy with Northern States Power Co. in return for dropping our opposition to its proposed merger with New Century Energies.
- Founded the Illinois Clean Energy Community Foundation and driving its start-up to effectively leverage the $240 million in new assets to jump-start the development of energy efficiency and renewable resources in Illinois, which has historically relied almost entirely on polluting coal and nuclear plants.
- Won an injunction to halt logging on the ridge tops that could have caused soil erosion and destruction of the Bell Smith Springs Natural Landmark.
- Supported the construction of a Midwest high-speed rail network and gaining business, labor, civic and political support for the nine-state regional rail initiative.

2001

- ELPC developed Repowering the Midwest – The Clean Energy Development Plan for the Heartland a d regional blueprint for renewable energy development. Followed by the release of Job Jolt – The Economic Impacts of Implementing Repowering the Midwest's Clean Energy Development Plan.
- Succeeded in bringing and winning United States Supreme Court to halt a steel company's punitive damages lawsuit against a grassroots citizens’ group that had brought a reasonable environmental enforcement action.

2002

- Protected the vital Lake Calumet ecological restoration on the Southeast Side of Chicago from a proposed new 1,000-slip boat marina in the lake.
- Promoted "smart growth" measures that prevented two proposed new outlying bypass roads around Petoskey and Traverse City, Michigan from being constructed.
- Spearheaded creation and enactment of the innovative new Clean Energy Development programs in the 2002 Federal Farm Bill–a win-win-win for farmers, rural economic development and the environment.
- Lead legal challenges in support of Clean Water Act "antidegradation" regulations.

2003

- Made the Farm Bill's new Clean Energy Development programs work on the ground – protecting federal funding for the key Section 9006 renewable energy and energy efficiency program against the Administration's proposed cutbacks, and eco-business deal-making for the Midwest to gain two-thirds of the nation's Section 9006 grant funds.
- Engaged in emergency litigation to hold off two large timber sales in the Chequamegon-Nicolet National Forest in Northern Wisconsin.
- Ten years later, stalling two massive, sprawl-inducing outlying tollroads in Lake County and Will County, Illinois that were "done deals" when ELPC started work in 1993.

2004

- Lobbied for the passage of the Illinois Energy Efficient Commercial Building Act, a step to push companies to adopt energy efficiency in green buildings and avoid future pollution.
- Prevented construction of the Hartmann-Hammond Bridge in Traverse City, Michigan, promoting the Smart Roads Alternative instead.
- Prevented construction of the Route 53 toll road expansion in Lake County, Illinois when the Illinois State Toll Highway Authority removed this proposed $1.3 billion toll road from its 10-year transportation plan following public advocacy pressure by ELPC and our colleagues.
- Spurred development of Illinois’ first wind power farms producing clean energy and leading the Midwest charge for clean renewable energy development now accelerating throughout the region.

2005

- Protected almost 25,000 acres of Wisconsin's Northwoods from excessive logging through successful emergency legal appeals in Federal District Court to three timber sales approved by the U.S. Forest Service.
- Legally intervened in a federal lawsuit to force Dynegy Midwest Generation to put modern pollution controls on their coal plants in Southern Illinois.

2006

- Worked with the Illinois Governor's Office and the Illinois EPA to develop and pass a mercury pollution reduction rule that is one of the strongest in the nation, after building a strong environmental and healthcare coalition to support the adoption of these new standards.
- Persuaded the Illinois Pollution Control Board to adopt a stringent new rule limiting the acceptable concentration of phosphorus in wastewater from most new or expanding city wastewater and industrial plants.
- Prevented the construction of the Sugar Creek dam by the City of Marion through a decade of legal action.
- Advocated for a Midwest High Speed Rail Network; with lobbying effort to double funding for Amtrak in Illinois.

2007

- Along with other environmental groups, ELPC put public pressure on BP to not increase pollution into the Great Lakes and legally challenged a permit issued by the Indiana Department of Environmental Management.

2008

- Lobbied state officials to pass an electronic waste recycling law in Illinois that requires manufacturers to collect and recycle or re-use E-Waste.
- The EPLC lobbied Congress to quadruple spending on green energy development programs in the 2008 Farm Bill.

2009

- Led the successful campaign to impose additional regulations on residential buildings in Illinois through its lobbying efforts in favor of the Energy Efficient Residential Building Code.
- In 2009, the ELPC lobbied for quadrupling of federal funding for an innovative farm energy program.

2010

- In 2010, the ELPC lobbied for a $2.6 billion expansion of high speed rail corridors in the Midwest in the "Stimulus".
- In 2010, pressured the state of Illinois to adopt a "solar ramp-up" policy, which mandates the purchase of $1 billion of solar energy by state utilities.
- Prevented construction of a new coal power plant in the Rogers City, Michigan with years of legal action.
- Due to an ELPC's legal challenge, the State of Iowa was required to approve new "anti-degradation" rules, regulations that force communities to make the most "environmentally beneficial" decisions regardless of cost when improving infrastructure.
- In 2010, the ELPC sued the state of Wisconsin to compel the state to regulate excess phosphorus emissions in waterways.

2011

- Due to advocacy by local organizations including the ELPC, the city of Chicago disinfects 1.2 billion gallons of wastewater returned to the river daily.
- Successfully advocated for Illinois' improved recycling law, which diverts electronic waste with toxic components to landfills where the chemicals can leach and contaminate groundwater used for community drinking water supplies.
- Used the Clean Water Act to require stringent phosphorus reduction and anti-degradation standards in Iowa and Wisconsin.
- The ELPC successfully lobbied for a solar "carve out" in Illinois' Renewable Energy Standard that will require customers to purchase produce megawatts of installed solar by 2015.

2012

- March 15: Indiana adopted anti-degradation standards, required by the Clean Water Act, to protect waterways.
- February 29: After years of legal action by ELPC accompanied by advocacy from environmental organizations, Illinois' Fisk and Crawford coal plants announced planned closures for 2012 and 2014.

== See also ==
- Sustainability
- Biodiversity
- Ecology
- Fix it First
