= Charles Marohn =

American engineer and author

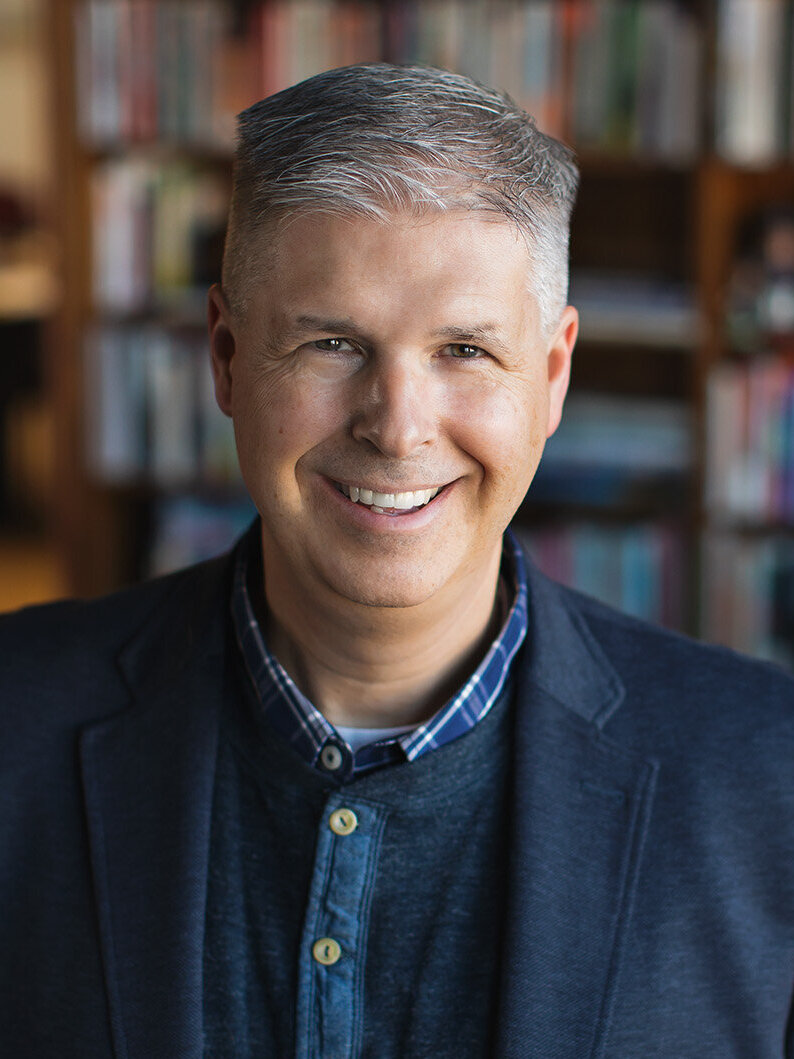
- Marohn in 2021
- Born: Charles L. Marohn Jr. c. 1973; Baxter, Minnesota, US
- Other name: Chuck Marohn
- Education: University of Minnesota (BEng, MURP)
- Occupations: President of Strong Towns, author, civil engineer
- Known for: Strong Towns, stroads
- Notable work: Strong Towns: A Bottom-Up Revolution to Rebuild American Prosperity (2019), Confessions of a Recovering Engineer (2021), Escaping The Housing Trap (2024)

Charles Marohn (born c. 1973) is an American author, land-use planner, municipal engineer, and the founder and president of Strong Towns, an organization which advocates for the development of dense towns and the restructuring of suburbia.

== Early life and education ==
Charles L. Marohn Jr grew up in Baxter, Minnesota on a small farm.

He graduated from Brainerd High School in 1991. Marohn received a Bachelor of Science in civil engineering and a Masters in Urban and Regional Planning from the University of Minnesota. In 2000 he became a licensed professional engineer (PE) in the state of Minnesota.

In 2022, Maron was appealing a fine by the state licensing board for having a gap in his engineering license, yet still calling himself a PE. Marohn and Sam Gedge at the Institute for Justice viewed this action as a limitation upon his first amendment rights because of his critical statements made about the practices of traffic engineering, as well as his disapproval of civil engineers who he views as doing little to protect human life on roads.

== Strong Towns ==
Marohn giving a lecture about Strong Towns in Seattle in 2016

Marohn started Strong Towns as a blog in 2008. He was frustrated with projects he was working on that he believed were actively harming the places they were supposed to help. As he gained readers, he realized there was a need for an organization that advocated the principles he espoused. Strong Towns became a nonprofit organization to "support a model of growth that allows America’s towns to become financially strong and resilient".

Marohn believes that post-World War II suburban development has failed because it is inherently economically unsustainable. He posits that low-density communities do not produce the tax revenue necessary to cover either their current services or the long-term costs of maintaining and replacing their services, and that suburbs are very difficult to adapt to an efficient, dense model because they were built as fully developed places.

In 2011, he coined the word "stroad," a street/road hybrid, which has become popular among urbanists and planners. According to Marohn, stroads are the "futon" of transportation alternatives. "Where a futon is an uncomfortable couch that also serves as an uncomfortable bed, a STROAD is an auto corridor that does not move cars efficiently while simultaneously providing little in the way of value capture."

In late 2015, Marohn participated in a White House conference on rural placemaking.

== Personal life ==
Marohn lives with his wife and two daughters in Brainerd, Minnesota.

== Publications ==
=== Books ===
- Thoughts on Building Strong Towns. Vol. 1. CreateSpace Independent Publishing Platform. 2012. ISBN 9781478319276. OCLC 811562415.
- A World Class Transportation System: Transportation Finance for a New Economy (2014)
- Thoughts on Building Strong Towns. Vol. 2. CreateSpace Independent Publishing Platform. 2016. ISBN 9781533018557. OCLC 961354092.
- Thoughts on Building Strong Towns. Vol. 3. CreateSpace Independent Publishing Platform. 2017. ISBN 9781979930130. OCLC 1056192944.
- Strong Towns: A Bottom-Up Revolution to Rebuild American Prosperity. Wiley & Sons. 2019. ISBN 9781119564812. OCLC 1129707808.
- Confessions of a Recovering Engineer: Transportation for a Strong Town. Wiley & Sons. 2021. ISBN 9781119699293. OCLC 1156995179.
- Marohn, Charles; Herriges, Daniel (2024). Escaping the Housing Trap: The Strong Towns Response to the Housing Crisis. Wiley & Sons. ISBN 9781119984528.

== See also ==
- Urban consolidation
- Urban growth boundary
- Urban resilience
- New Urbanism
