= Chidley =

Chidley may refer to:

- Chidley, Devonshire, a former name of Chulmleigh, England
- Cape Chidley, Canada
- Cape Chidley Islands, Nunavut, Canada

== People with the surname ==
- Katherine Chidley (fl. 1616–1653), English activist
- Samuel Chidley (1616–c.1672), English Puritan activist
- William James Chidley (c. 1860-1916), Australian natural living advocate
