= Illicit =

Illicit may refer to:

- Illicit antiquities
- Illicit cigarette trade
- Illicit drug trade
  - Illicit drug use
  - Illicit Drug Anti-Proliferation Act
- Illicit financial flows
- Illicit major
- Illicit minor
- Illicit trade
- Illicit work
- Illicit Streetwear clothing company
- Illicit (Dance music group)
- Illicit (1931 film), a film starring Barbara Stanwyck
- Illicit (2017 film), an American thriller film
- Illicit (album), a 1992 album by Tribal Tech

== See also ==
- Valid but illicit
