= Negative conclusion from affirmative premises =

In logic, a type of syllogistic fallacy

Negative conclusion from affirmative premises is a syllogistic fallacy committed when a categorical syllogism has a negative conclusion yet both premises are affirmative. The inability of affirmative premises to reach a negative conclusion is usually cited as one of the basic rules of constructing a valid categorical syllogism.

Statements in syllogisms can be identified as the following forms:

- a: All A is B. (affirmative)
- e: No A is B. (negative)
- i: Some A is B. (affirmative)
- o: Some A is not B. (negative)

The rule states that a syllogism in which both premises are of form a or i (affirmative) cannot reach a conclusion of form e or o (negative). Exactly one of the premises must be negative to construct a valid syllogism with a negative conclusion. (A syllogism with two negative premises commits the related fallacy of exclusive premises.)

Example (invalid aae form):

Premise: All colonels are officers.
Premise: All officers are soldiers.
Conclusion: Therefore, no colonels are soldiers.

The aao-4 form is perhaps more subtle as it follows many of the rules governing valid syllogisms, except it reaches a negative conclusion from affirmative premises.

Invalid aao-4 form:

All A is B.
All B is C.
Therefore, some C is not A.

This is valid only if A is a proper subset of B and/or B is a proper subset of C. However, this argument reaches a faulty conclusion if A, B, and C are equivalent. In the case that A = B = C, the conclusion of the following simple aaa-1 syllogism would contradict the aao-4 argument above:

All B is A.
All C is B.
Therefore, all C is A.

== See also ==
- Affirmative conclusion from a negative premise, in which a syllogism is invalid because an affirmative conclusion is reached from a negative premise
- Fallacy of exclusive premises, in which a syllogism is invalid because both premises are negative
