= Quasi-syllogism =

Categorical syllogism

Quasi-syllogism is a categorical syllogism where one of the premises is singular, and thus not a categorical statement.

For example:

1. All men are mortal
2. Socrates is a man
3. Socrates is mortal

In the above argument, while premise 1 is a categorical, premise 2 is a singular statement referring to one individual. While this is a valid logical form, it is not strictly a categorical syllogism.

Of course, it has been suggested that you can translate any singular statement into a categorical.

For example:

1. Socrates is a man
2. All members of a class of which the only member is Socrates are men

The above two premises may be considered identical, but the first is a singular and the second is a categorical.

== See also ==
- Transitivity of hyponymy
- Type of syllogism (disjunctive, hypothetical, legal, poly-, prosleptic, quasi-, statistical)
