= Fallacy of exclusive premises =

Logical fallacy in syllogisms

The fallacy of exclusive premises is a syllogistic fallacy committed in a categorical syllogism that is invalid because both of its premises are negative.

== Examples ==
=== Example 1 (EOO-4 type) ===
E Proposition: No cats are dogs.
O Proposition: Some dogs are not pets.
O Proposition: Therefore, some pets are not cats.

Explanation:

This may seem like a logical conclusion, as it appears to be logically derived that, if some dogs are not pets, then, surely, some are pets, because, otherwise, the premise would have stated "No Dogs are pets"; and, if some pets are dogs, then, not all pets can be cats. Thus, one might think, some pets are not cats. But, if this assumption is applied to the final statement, then one has drawn the conclusion: some pets are cats. This is not supported by either premise. Cats not being dogs, and the state of dogs as either pets or not, have nothing to do with whether cats are pets: the assertion in the conclusion may well be true, but it does not follow from the premises. Two negative premises cannot give a logical foundation for a conclusion, as they will invariably be independent statements that cannot be directly related: Hence, they are called "exclusive premises".

=== Example 2 (also EOO-4 type) ===
It is made more clear when the subjects in the argument are more clearly unrelated such as the following:

E Proposition: No planets are dogs.
O Proposition: Some dogs are not pets.
O Proposition: Therefore, some pets are not planets.

Explanation:

In this example, one can more clearly see that the physical difference between a dog and a planet is not causally linked to the domestication of dogs. The two premises are exclusive and the subsequent conclusion is nonsense, as the transpose would imply that some pets are planets.

== Conclusion ==
The verisimilitude of the final statement is not relevant in this fallacy. The conclusions in both examples are uncontroversial; however, both are argued on fallacious logic and would not hold up as valid arguments.

== See also ==
- Affirmative conclusion from a negative premise, in which a syllogism is invalid because the conclusion is affirmative yet one of the premises is negative
- Negative conclusion from affirmative premises, in which a syllogism is invalid because the conclusion is negative yet the premises are affirmative
