= Katherine Chidley =

English Puritan activist and religious controversialist (fl. 1616–1653)

Personal details
- Born: Unknown: probably 1590s. Probably Shrewsbury.
- Died: 1653 or later. London
- Party: Levellers
- Spouse: Daniel Chidley
- Relations: Samuel Chidley (son)
- Profession: Haberdasher

Katherine Chidley (fl. 1616–1653) was an English Puritan activist and controversialist. Initially involved in resistance to episcopal authority and in separatist activity in Shrewsbury and London, she emerged during the English Civil War as a powerful advocate of an Independent or Congregationalist polity. Under the Commonwealth of England and the Protectorate she was a leader of Leveller women, noted for her contribution to campaigns on behalf of John Lilburne.

== Shrewsbury ==
Chidley's origins and background, even her own family name, are unknown. She first appears in Shrewsbury as the wife of Daniel Chidley. The Shrewsbury Burgess Roll lists him in 1621, under the name Chidloe, as a tailor and the son of William, a yeoman of Burlton, a village to the north of Shrewsbury. By this time he had two sons, Samuel and Daniel. Katherine may have been from Shrewsbury or the surrounding area, like Daniel, but it is impossible to be certain. The baptism of the first child, Samuel, described as the son of "Daniell Chedler" was recorded in the parish register of St Chad's Church, Shrewsbury on 13 April 1618: the spelling of the surname is very varied. Between 1618 and 1629, the register records the baptisms of eight Chidley children and the burial of one, Daniel, who died in infancy. The couple were so intent on having a son with his father's name that they named a further son Daniel, which throws into question their naming of the first son. Katharine Gillespie has suggested that the naming of Samuel may have implied a likening of Katherine Chidley to the Biblical Hannah, who in 1 Samuel 1:21–28 dedicated her first child, Samuel, to God and refused the traditional purification ritual until the child was weaned. Moreover, the dedication of the Biblical Samuel is followed by a prophetic utterance from Hannah, 1 Samuel 2:1–10, the model for the Magnificat, that looks forward to an overturning of existing power relations. Katherine Chidley herself was not mentioned in the parish register entries until the baptism on 12 February 1626 of the second Daniel, who was recorded as "s. of Daniell & Katharn Chedley"

Following the birth of the second Daniel, and possibly at earlier births, Katherine Chidley refused to undergo the Churching of women, a service prescribed in the Book of Common Prayer. She was not alone in this: the ceremony was suspect to Puritans, even of the fairly moderate kind. Particularly resented was the use of Psalm 121, with its striking spell-like verse 6, "The sun shall not smite thee by day, nor the moon by night." Katherine, along with Judith Wright and five other women, was cited for refusing to be churched by the Peter Studley, the High Church incumbent of St Chad's, later in the year, during a canonical visitation under Thomas Morton, then Bishop of Coventry and Lichfield. Judith was the wife of George Wright, sometime bailiff of Shrewsbury, and the couple had son, Joshua, baptised on 25 April 1625: George Wright was one of the relatively small number accorded the title of Mr. in the register, showing that he was regarded as socially superior to artisans like Daniel Chidley. However, he was cited for allowing meetings to hear sermons and sing hymns in his home on Sunday evenings, and it is known that these were centred on Julines Herring, the town's public preacher, of whom the Wrights were key supporters. Studley deferred to Morton's judgement: "whether Action of gathering together may be termed a conventicle we refer to your honorable court to judge and determine." Katherine and her husband were also among twenty parishioners presented to the Consistory court for failure to attend church. This may suggest that they had already sought to form a conventicle or separatist group. However, William Rowley, another former bailiff, was cited with them, although he was certainly not a separatist but a leader of the Puritan faction on the corporation and a close supporter of the Presbyterian Herring.

Although Studley chose for tactical reasons to conflate them, there seem to have been two distinct Puritan oppositional groups at St Chad's. Herring himself considered the Chidleys separatists and his biographer, Samuel Clarke reports that: "When some seeds of separation were scattered in Salop (by Daniel Childey and his wife,) their growth was checked by his appearing against them." Herring's criticism of them is reported as:

It is a sin of an high nature to unchurch a Nation at once, and that this would become the spring of many other fearful errours, for separation will eat like a Gangrene into the heart of Godlinesse. And he did pray, that they who would un-church others, might not be un-christianed themselves.

The Chidleys were distinct from the moderate Presbyterian Puritans in social class as well as theology. However, they continued to have their children christened at St Chad's, which was contrary to the beliefs and practice of convinced separatists. The last baptism of a Chidley child at St Chad's was of John on 26 October 1629, and the register has a gap where Katherine's name should be. In order to find like-minded people, and possibly for economic reasons also, the Chidleys were forced to move. It seems that their radicalism was deepened by the experience of living in London and it is possible that it was only in London that they moved decisively to a separatist position.

== London ==
The Chidley's are shown to have been active in London by 1630 by a manuscript in the collection of Benjamin Stinton, and used by the Baptist historian Thomas Crosby. This records Daniel Chidley helping John Dupper or Duppa and Thomas Dyer to form a separatist church in the capital. This group was a splinter from a church which was organised by Henry Jacob in Southwark before his departure for New England, and later pastored by John Lothropp. The new grouping distinguished itself by rejecting entirely communion or contact with Anglican churches – an issue brought to the fore when one member had his child baptised in his local parish church, exactly as the Chidleys had previously done. Katherine and Daniel Chidley seem to have been involved in this radical underground resistance to the established Church throughout the 1630s. David Brown, a founder member of the group, implies that they tore a surplice as a deliberate act of iconoclasm one St Luke's Day (18 October) at Greenwich. This was a particularly ungodly place in their eyes because a Catholic chapel had been installed there for Queen Henrietta Maria. Little is known of the group's activities and it is unclear whether such direct action was typical. However, the Chidleys made progress socially and financially after their move to London. Daniel became a freeman of the Worshipful Company of Haberdashers in 1632, and their eldest son, Samuel, was admitted as an apprentice in 1634.

== Controversies with Presbyterians ==
=== The Justification of the Independent Churches ===
Katherine's own views were made public for the first time in October 1641, just less than a year into the Long Parliament, which Charles I was forced to call because of his disastrous handling of the Scottish Presbyterians, culminating in the Bishops' Wars. Chidley's target was Reasons Against the Independent Government of Particular Congregations, an attack on the Congregational polity by the English Presbyterian controversialist Thomas Edwards. The issue was one of great political importance and events were moving generally in the direction Edwards favoured. In negotiations between the Parliament and the Scottish Covenanters, the Scots had gradually but relentlessly pressed the case for a Presbyterian reformation of the Church of England and had brought along four ministers specifically to combat the Independents: "to satisfy the minds of many in England who love the way of New England better than that of Presbyteries used in our Church." Parliament had temporised, committing only to a reformation of the Church "in due time as shall best conduce to the glory of God and the peace of the Church," but it was clear that there would be a need for serious concessions to the Scots if hostilities broke out between king and Parliament. Chidley's response to the situation was The Justification of the Independant Churches of Christ. Being an Answer to Mr. Edwards his Booke. Edwards had attacked the Independents both for separatism and for what he saw as their unstable and fissiparous structures. In particular, he had no confidence in the ability of ordinary people to judge the value of ministers:

Now how can the people three or foure visible Saints, or more, joyned into a Church, examine and try the learning, gifts, soundnesse of men for the Ministry, who are themselves ignorant in all kind of Learning, and may be weake and injudicious?

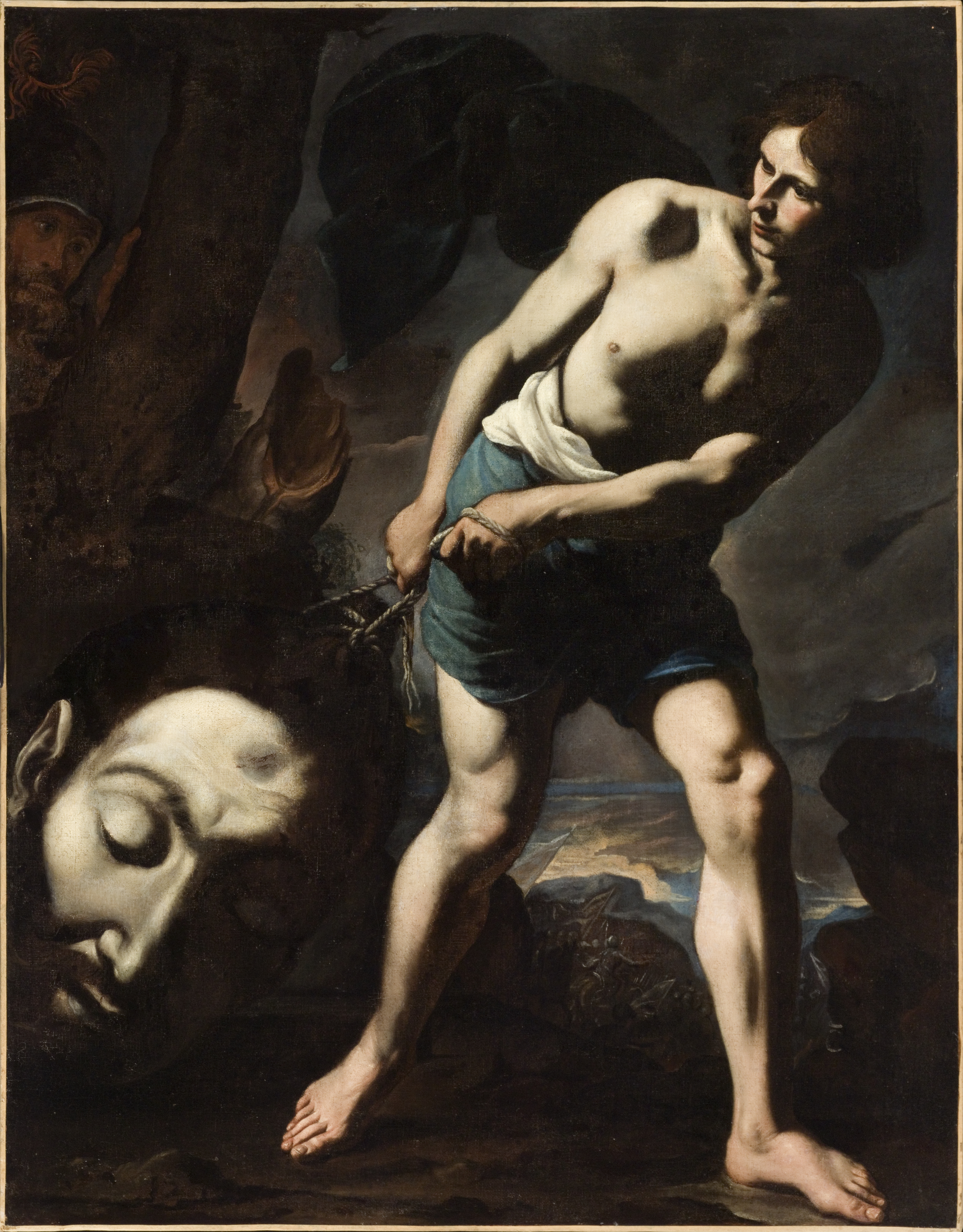
David with the head of Goliath by Andrea Vaccaro, c.1635

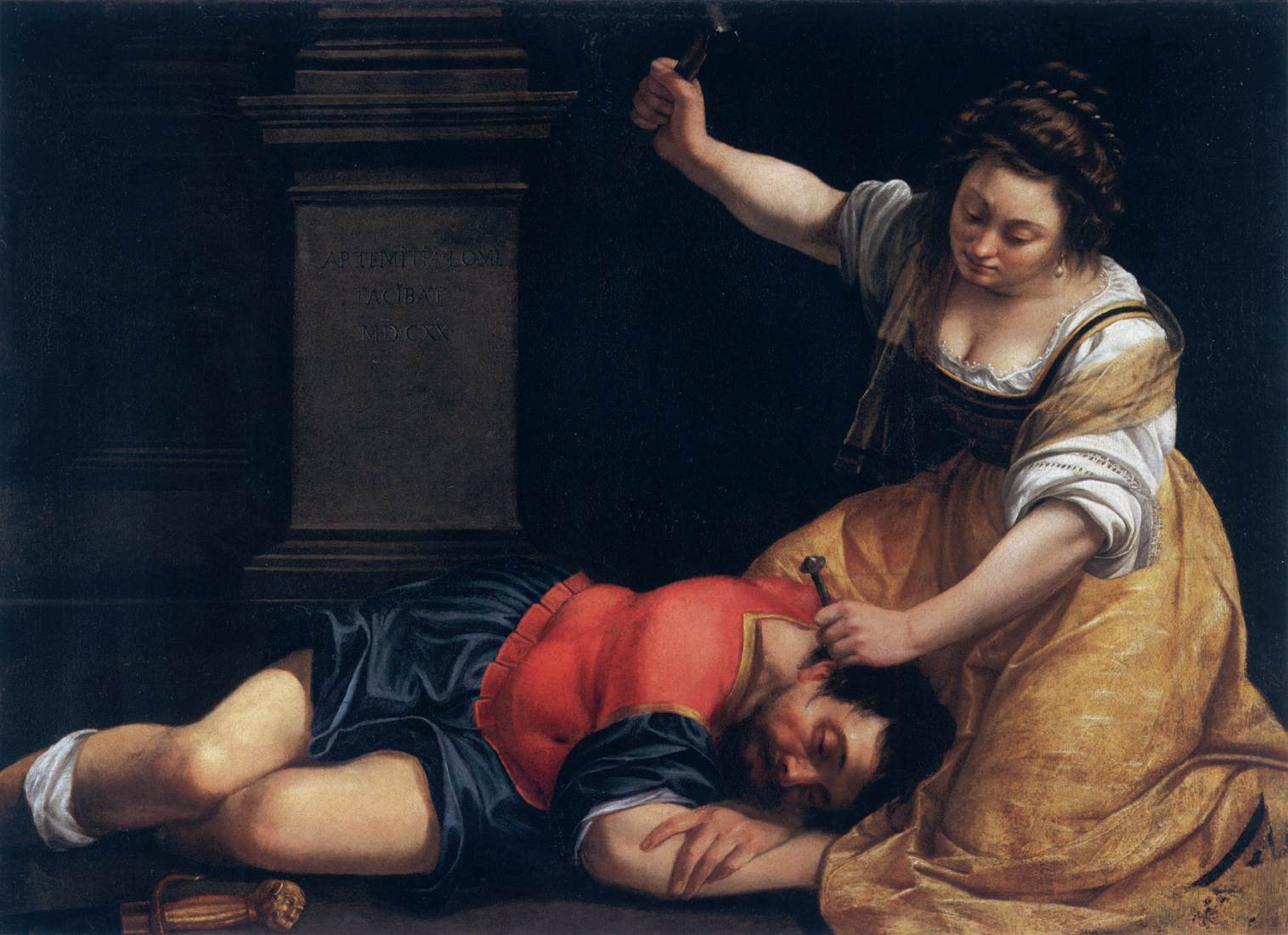
Jael and Sisera by Artemisia Gentileschi, another contemporary of Katherine Chidley

Chidley asked for the reader's indulgence, as she knew she did not have the education and experience of the formidable Edwards:

But though these my Answers are not laid downe in a Schollerlik way, but by the plaine truth of holy Scripture; yet I beseech thee have the patience to take the paynes to reade them, and spare some time to consider them...

However, the Biblical quotations she chose were for the title page were highly provocative. The first, 1 Samuel 17:45, reports the challenge of David to Goliath. The other was Judges 4:21, referring to the Jael, who smashed the skull of an enemy of the Israelites. Both seem to suggest that the age of power and authority is to give way to one of rule by consent and the reversal of order may be suggesting specifically that monarchy is giving way to one of more diffuse localised, authority.

She began her response by roundly declaring the lawfulness of separation:

For my owne part, considering that the Church of England is governed by the Canon Lawes (the Discipline of Antichrist) and altogether wanteth the Discipline of Christ, and that the most of them are ignorant what it is, and also doe professe to worship God by a stinted Service-Booke. I hold it not onely lawfull, but also the duty of all those who are informed of such evills, to separate themselves from them, and such as doe adhere unto them; and also to joyne together in the outward profession and practise of Gods true worship, when God hath declared unto them what it is; and being thus informed in their minds of the knowledge of the will of God (by the teaching of his Sonne Jesus Christ) it is their duty to put it in practise, not onely in a Land where they have Toleration, but also where they are forbidden to preach, or teach in the name (or by the power) of the Lord Jesus.

She gave vent to considerable bitterness against the clergy of the Church of England, whom she called "those Locusts, which ascended out of the bottomlesse pit, Rev. 9." Later in the book she listed the ways in which the Episcopalian clergy exploited the poor, including one which refers to the fee extracted for the churching of women, which she had boycotted in Shrewsbury.

Further, they will yet have another patrimony for the birth of that childe, for before the mother dare goe abroade, shee must have their blessing; that the Sun shall not smite her by day, nor the Moone by night; for which blessing of theirs, they must have an offering, and the like they require for all the children that be borne into this world, though there live not one of sixe to be men or women.

However, separation, in her view, was an ecclesiological imperative, rather than a political expedient:

I could not but declare by the testimony of the Scripture it selfe, that the way of Separation is the way of God, who is the author of it, which manifestly appeares by his separating of his Church from the world, and the world from his Church in all ages.

Edwards had drawn attention to the lack of ministers in the Independent churches and challenged the authority of those they had. Chidley unpicked the ambiguities in his own claim to authority:

And though Mr. Edwards boast himselfe heare, to be a Minister of the Gospell, and a sufferer for it, yet I challenge him, to prove unto me, that he hath any Calling or, Ordination to the Ministry, but that which he hath successively from Rome; If he lay claime to that; he is one of the Popes household; But if he deny that calling, then is he as void of a calling to the worke of the Ministry, and as void of Ordination, as any of those Ministers, whom hee calleth Independant men, (which have cust off the Ordination of the Prelates) and consequently as void of Ordination as a macanicall trades man.

Chidley was anti-clerical in tone. She renounced the whole idea of apostolic succession in favour of apostolic mission:

Further you alleadge, That if they be ordained, it is by persons who are not in office. Now if you meane, they have no office because they are not elected, ordained and set apart by the Clergie to some serviceable, administration; I pray you tell me who ordained the Apostles, Prophets, and Evangelists to their worke or Ministry?

Chidley challenged any notion of social superiority or clerical status as a qualification for establishing and governing churches:

Your Question is, Whether it be fitting, that well meaning Christians should be suffered to goe to make Churches? To this I Answer, It is fitter for well meaning Christians than for ill-meaning Christians, for well-meaning Christians be the fittest on the earth to make Churches, and to choose their Officers; whether they be Taylors, Felt-makers, Button-makers, Tent-makers, Shepherds, or Ploughmen, or what honest Trade soever, if they are well-meaning Christians; but ill-meaning Priests are very unfit men to make Churches; because what they build up with one hand, they pull downe with the other.

Government by elders was common ground between Presbyterians and Independents:

Christ commanded the Apostles to ordaine Elders in every Church by election; therefore the Apostles taught the Churches to ordaine Elders by Election also.

However, any superstructure beyond the immediate local level was another matter. Chidley expressed total distrust in any authority not specifically sanctioned by God:

IN your sixth Reason you affirme that the government of the Church by Synods, is no where forbidden by God in the new Testament, either directly, or by consequence. But I doe affirme the contrary, and prove it thus; That whatsoever Government is not commanded by God is accursed, and that is plainely manifested in the New Testament, Rev. 22.18.

Edwards had rejected Toleration as likely to lead to the rising of subordinate groups in society and to social collapse. Chidley, however, championed the people, including the poor:

And that the Church of Christ consisteth of meane persons, is no wonder; for wee have learned, that the poore receive the Gospell, and you know you have granted, that it stands with the light and Law of Nature, That the liberty, power, and rule, should be in the whole, and not in one man or a few; so that the power must rest in the body; and not in the Officers, though the Church be never so poore.

Where Edwards thought that male householders would lose their authority over wives, children and servants, she argued:

O! that you would consider the text in 1 Cor. 7 which plainly declares that the wife may be a beleever, & the husband an unbeleever, but if you have considered this Text. I pray you tell me, what authority this unbeleeving husband hath over the conscience of his beleeving wife; It is true he hath authority over her in bodily and civill respects, but not to be a Lord over her conscience.

=== A New-Yeares-Gift ===
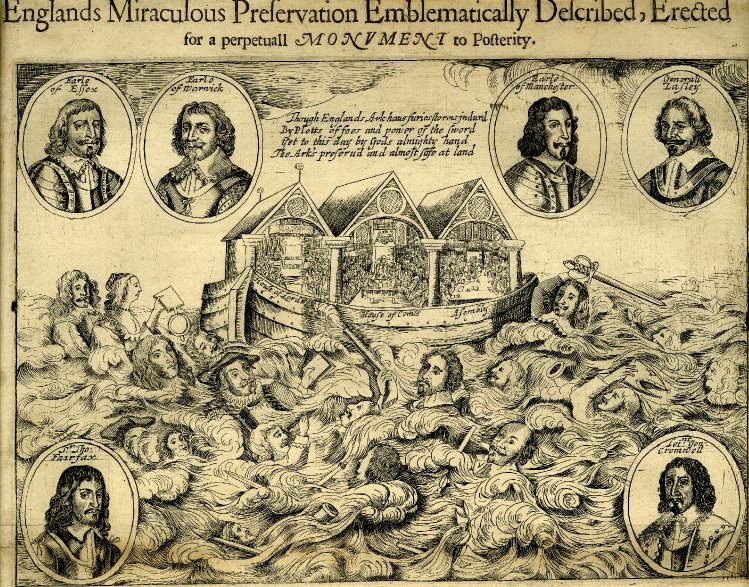
1646 broadside depicting the two Houses of Parliament and the Westminster Assembly as the Trinity of State

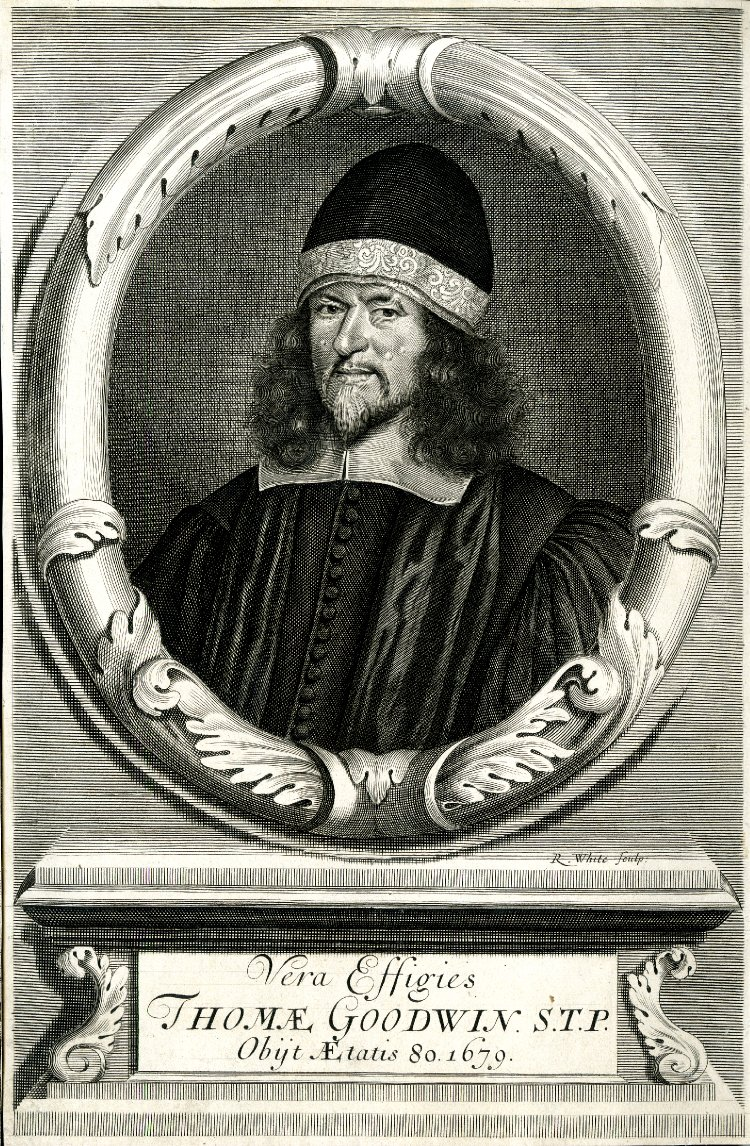
Thomas Goodwin, leader of the five dissident divines attacked by Edwards

Chidley's further contributions to controversy mirrored the developing political and military situation. The onset of the English Civil War forced the House of Commons of England on 6 September 1642 to pledge the abolition of episcopacy and unification with the Church of Scotland, although the practical working out of such a scheme was remitted to the Westminster Assembly of Divines. However, series of disasters for the Parliamentarians during 1643 forced acceptance of the Solemn League and Covenant, sworn by both Houses of Parliament on 22 September, committing England to a Presbyterian polity headed by the king. In the last months of 1644, with Parliament's situation increasingly secure, the Assembly of Divines brought forward proposals for the Presbyterian reorganisation, embodied in two reports or advices to Parliament: debate was scheduled for January 1645. Chidley recommenced hostilities with Edwards at this point by publishing A New-Yeares-Gift, or a Brief Exhortation to Mr. Thomas Edwards; that he may breake off his old sins, in the old yeare, and begin the New yeare, with new fruits of Love, first to God, and then to his Brethren. This sought to combat damaging claims he had made about the conduct of Independents in Antapologia, an attack on five dissenting members of the Westminster Assembly who were sympathetic to the Independents. Edwards had used smear tactics, seeking to conflate numerous disparate strands of dissent, all of which he claimed were proliferating under the noses of Parliamentarians.

We have seene also by our own experience in this intermysticall season (though there hath been no formall Toleration) yet for want of Government setled, and people having been left to so great libertie, multitudes are fallen, and doe daily to Antinomianisme, Anabaptisme, Independencie, yea to denie the Immortalitie of the Soule, and then no expectation but many will fall more and more: Independents and all kinde of Sectaries (as long as they can have their libertie) snuffe up the wind, will not hearken to any way whereby they may receive satisfaction, but if once the Magistrate declares, and by laws concludes one way of Church-worship and Government, then it may be they will heare Reason...

Chidley observed that to answer Edwards was "a taske most befitting a woman." She sought to distinguish the Calvinist separatists from other, unrelated sects, including Anabaptists. Against Antinomianism she argued:

But I would have you (& all men) know, that I doe not (neither doe any that are truly religious) plead for such a Toleration, as you would father upon us, even a Toleration to sinne; We plead not for a Toleration of all sorts of persons (who are members of the Church of England,) for that were to plead for a Toleration for Theeves and Murderers, and Adulterers, and Sabbath-breakers, and all sorts of wicked livers, that all men might doe as they list; But the thing wee plead for, is a peaceable enjoyment of our liberty to worship God, publikely, according to his revealed word...

Against the Presbyterians, whom she saw as a new clerical élite, she affirmed the supremacy of the Church as a body over its ministry:

Now the Scripture is cleere, that Christ (who is ascended up on high) hath delivered the power to his Church, therefore it is also against the light and law of nature to, to conceive the Church to be thus subordinate to her servants...It is a dishonour unto Christ for them to usurp ecclesiastical authority over her.

At the end of the pamphlet Chidley lambasted Edwards himself:

I have shewed unto you the greatnesse of your sinne, and folly in particular, in making this Antipologia, as well as your former booke: They were both unseasonable, disordered, sinfull and ungrounded vapours; scandalizing the Churches of Christ: There are many untruths in them both, & that not onely where you make naked relations of Tales, but where you make profession before God, and the World, to bring sufficient reasons; when indeede you bring nothing but shadowes and fig-leaves.

Chidley's counterblast to Edwards was probably published on 2 January 1645 and delighted Thomas Goodwin, one of the dissenting divines, who noted that Edwards was "baffled by the pen of a woman." On the crucial question of setting up elected presbyteries in churches, the Commons voted in the affirmative on 6 January and resolved to inform the Scots of the decision. However, it decided only "that many and several congregations may be under one Presbyterial Government," leaving the dispute between Independents and Presbyterians unresolved. Chidley was clearly very active in this period, as Robert Baillie, one of the Scottish representatives to the Westminster Assembly, deploring the appearance of female preachers, noted her at work:

...none of the Independents, either in New England or Holland, neither the Brownists of Amsterdam, did ever give unto any women any publike Ecclesiastick power. In this, our London Independents exceed all their Brethren, who of late begin to give unto women power of debating in the face of the Congregation, and of determining Ecclesiastick causes by their suffrages, if Doctor Bastwick be rightly informed. Concerning the power of the Sacraments, Mistris Chidley is permitted to print in defence of the Independent cause, without the reproofe of any of that party, so farre as I have heard, that not only Pastors but private men out of all office, may lawfully celebrate both the Sacraments.

=== Good Counsell, to the Petitioners for Presbyterian Government ===
By the autumn 1645 the focus of debate was London, where the ministers and authorities were involved in numerous wrangles and difficulties in establishing a Presbyterian system. During this period in November Chidley issued a single-sheet pamphlet under the title Good Counsell, to the Petitioners for Presbyterian Government, That they may declare their Faith before they build their Church.Chidley was particularly critical of the London ministers, whom she condemned for being interested only in

MAINTENANCE and POWER: The one they have as Saul had the fat cattell, contrary to Gods commandment: The other they shall never have: for God will fight against such as fight for them, as it appears at this day: for they by usurped power ever shed the blood of the Saints, and Martyrs of Jesus, and now God is making inquisition for the blood which hath been spilt, and the more fiercely they go on to build up a Babel with blood; the more speedily will God come down to see their wickednes and to confound them.

Countering the charge that Independency led to heresy, she pointed to equal likelihood of abuses by a powerful clergy:

Presbyters practise is to preach what they list without controll, therefore errors may be broached by them privilegio.

Against this she set the checks implied in democratic control:

And whereas these Presbyterians affirm in their Petition that the Separates set up illeterate men to be their Pastors, let that come to the triall, for we desire not to be led by blind guides.

She ended by recommending the Presbyterians to return to apostolic ministry instead of tinkering with structures:

And therefore (in my judgement) it were better for them to make their confession of faith and catechise first, according to the rule of Gods Word, and then shape their Church according to that, rather then shape their Church according to the modell, and their faith according to their Church. Prepare thy work without, and make it fit for thy self in the field: and afterwards build thine house. Prov. 24:27.

Despite widespread discontent among Independents, particularly in the Parliamentarian army, Parliament decided in June 1646 to press ahead with a Presbyterian reorganisation of the Church of England. This went ahead at varying rates in London, with only eight of the twelve classes represented at the first synod in May 1647.

=== Gangraena ===
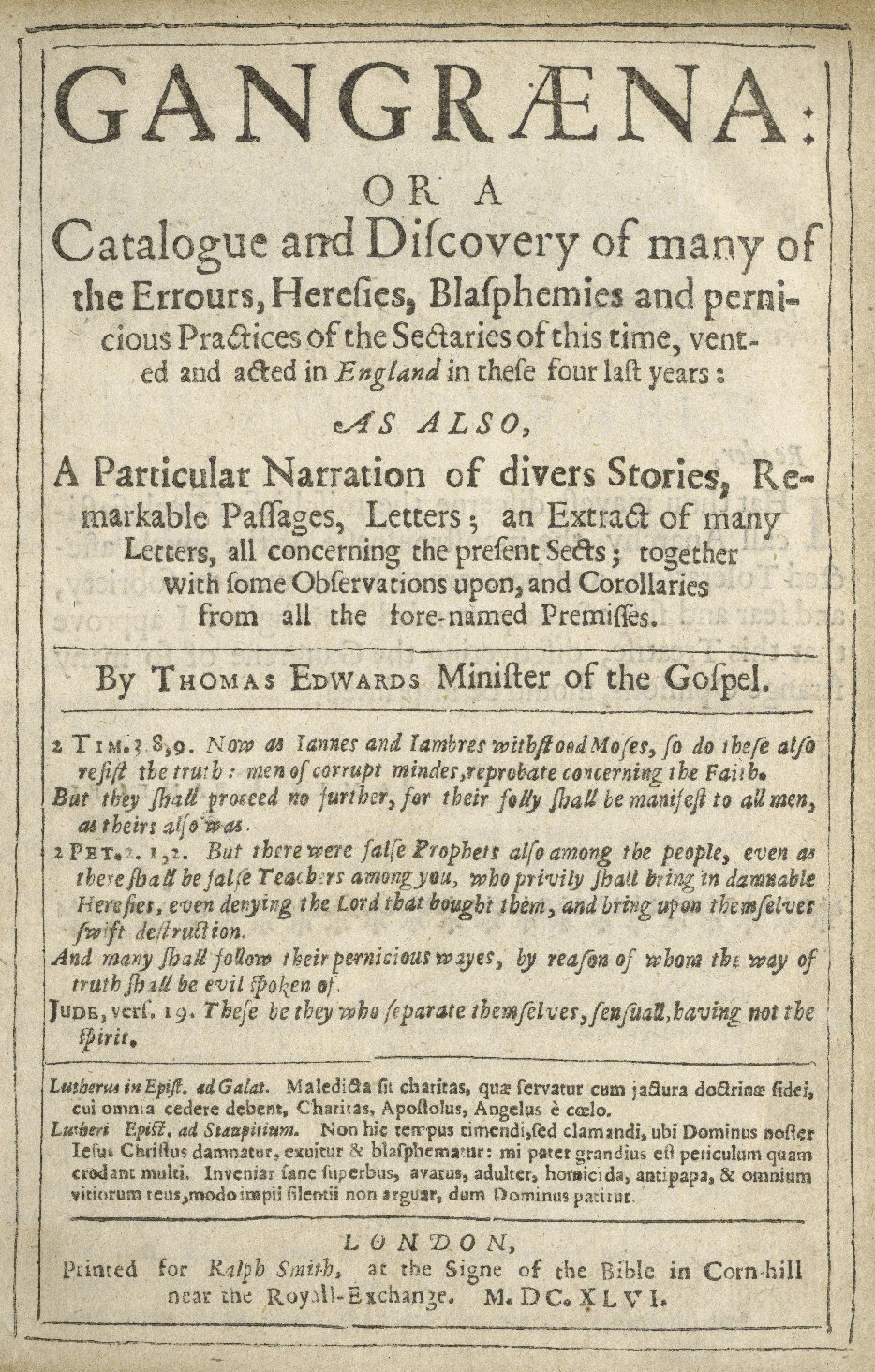
First edition of Gangræna

Chidley was one of the separatists denounced by Edwards in his comprehensive denunciation Gangraena, published in three parts during 1646 and 1647, and addressed to Parliament as a "Catalogue, or Black Bill of the Errours, Heresies, Blasphemies and Practices of the Sectaries of this time, broached and acted within these four last years in England…" Chidley is featured only twice in a very long and rambling book but in one of these Edwards does refer pointedly to the title of his book: Julines Herring, who had died the previous year in Amsterdam, is credited with using the image of gangrene earlier in his references specifically to the Chidleys. Edwards portrays Chidley as bitterly sectarian, narrating an incident he claimed had taken place at Stepney Meeting House, where the moderate Independent William Greenhill was pastor.

Katherine Chidley about August last came to Stepney, (where shee hath drawn away some persons to Brownisme) and was with Mr. Greenhill, where shee with a great deal of violence and bitternesse spake against all Ministers and people that meet in our Churches, and in places where any idolatrous services have been performed: Mr. Greenhill answered her by Scripture, and laboured to reduce to a short head all she had spoke, asking her if this were not the sum, namely, that it was unlawfull to worship God in a place which had been used or set apart to Idolatry, under the Names of Saints and Angels; she would not hold to the stating of the question, but running out, Mr. Greenhill to convince her, told her that all England in this way and manner had been set apart to St. George, and Scotland to Saint Andrew, and so other Kingdomes to other Saints; so that by her grounds it was unlawfull to worship God in these, and so by consequence anywhere in the world; but instead of being satisfied or giving any answer, shee was so talkative and clamorous, wearying him with her words, that he was glad to goe away, and so left her.

Edwards went on to relate the activities of Chidley and her son Samuel in Bury St Edmunds: a passage in which he described her as "brasen-faced audacious old woman resembled unto Jael," apparently using a comparison she had herself put into circulation, although presumably with a different valuation.

== Missionary activity ==
Katherine and Samuel Chidley were engaged in missionary work in Suffolk during 1647. Thomas Edwards testifies in the later part of Gangraena, compiled that year from readers' reports, that

There is one Katherine Chidly an old Brownist, and her sonne a young Brownist, a pragmaticall fellow, who not content with spreading their poyson in and about London goe down into the Country to gather people to them, and among other places have been this Summer at Bury in Suffolke to set up and gather a Church there...

The mission is known also from the extant covenant made by the church they helped found in Bury St Edmunds. The covenant is radically separatist:

and [wee] being conuinced in conscience of the evill of y^{e} Church of England, and of all other states w^{ch} are contrary to Christs institution. And being [(according to Christes institutions and comandements)] fully separated, not only from them, but also from those who comunicate with them either publickly or priuately, wee resolve by the grace of God, not to returne unto their vaine inuentions their human deuices, their abominable idolatries, or superstitious high places, which were built and dedicated to idolatry.

The community swore "to become a peculiar Temple for the Holy Ghoste to dwell in, an entier spouse of Jesus Christ our Lord of glory." Eight adults and six children subscribed, with Katherine and Samuel Chidley signing as witnesses, as compared with the seven converts estimated by Edwards.

The key member of the Bury congregation was John Lanseter, who became its first pastor and served until 1654, when he was expelled by his congregation for drunkenness. It seems that the Chidleys issued a pamphlet from Suffolk in response to the criticism of Katherine in the first part. Entitled Lanseter's Launce, Edwards mocked it: "as for Laseter's lance for my Gangraena, I shall shew it to be made not of iron or steele but a lance of brown painted paper, fit for children to play with." Edwards alleged that the Chidleys worked together "one inditing, the other writing."

Edwards had made clear that the Chidleys' expedition to Suffolk was not unique, and it seems likely that they continued agitating and planting new separatist churches throughout a period of uncertainty. Presbyterian reorganisation was even more patchy in the rest of the country than in London and another ordinance was passed in January 1648, with the aim of removing obstructions to the process. It foundered mainly as a result of opposition from Independents in the increasingly powerful army. The irascible Edwards had been forced to leave the country during late summer 1647 and surfaced in the Dutch Republic as a member of the English Reformed Church, Amsterdam: he died there on 7 February 1648. The Second English Civil War, with the abortive invasion of the country by a Scottish army in support of the king, resulted in the final collapse of the attempt to construct a Presbyterian system and the triumph of toleration for the Independents. The Presbyterian structures fell into neglect after 1648, although the remaining active classes continued ordaining ministers throughout the Commonwealth and Protectorate periods.

== Businesswoman ==
Daniel Chidley became a Master of the Haberdashers' Company in 1649 but died shortly after. Samuel Chidley became a Freeman of the company also in 1649. Katherine Chidley seems to have continued her husband's business, presumably with her son's help, and became a government contractor. This involved considerable sums. For supplying 4000 pairs of stockings to the army in Ireland she received £250 (equivalent to £40,617 in 2025) on 7 November 1651. On 7 January she was paid a further £104 3s. 4d. (equivalent to £16,924 in 2025) for 1000 pairs.

== Leveller ==
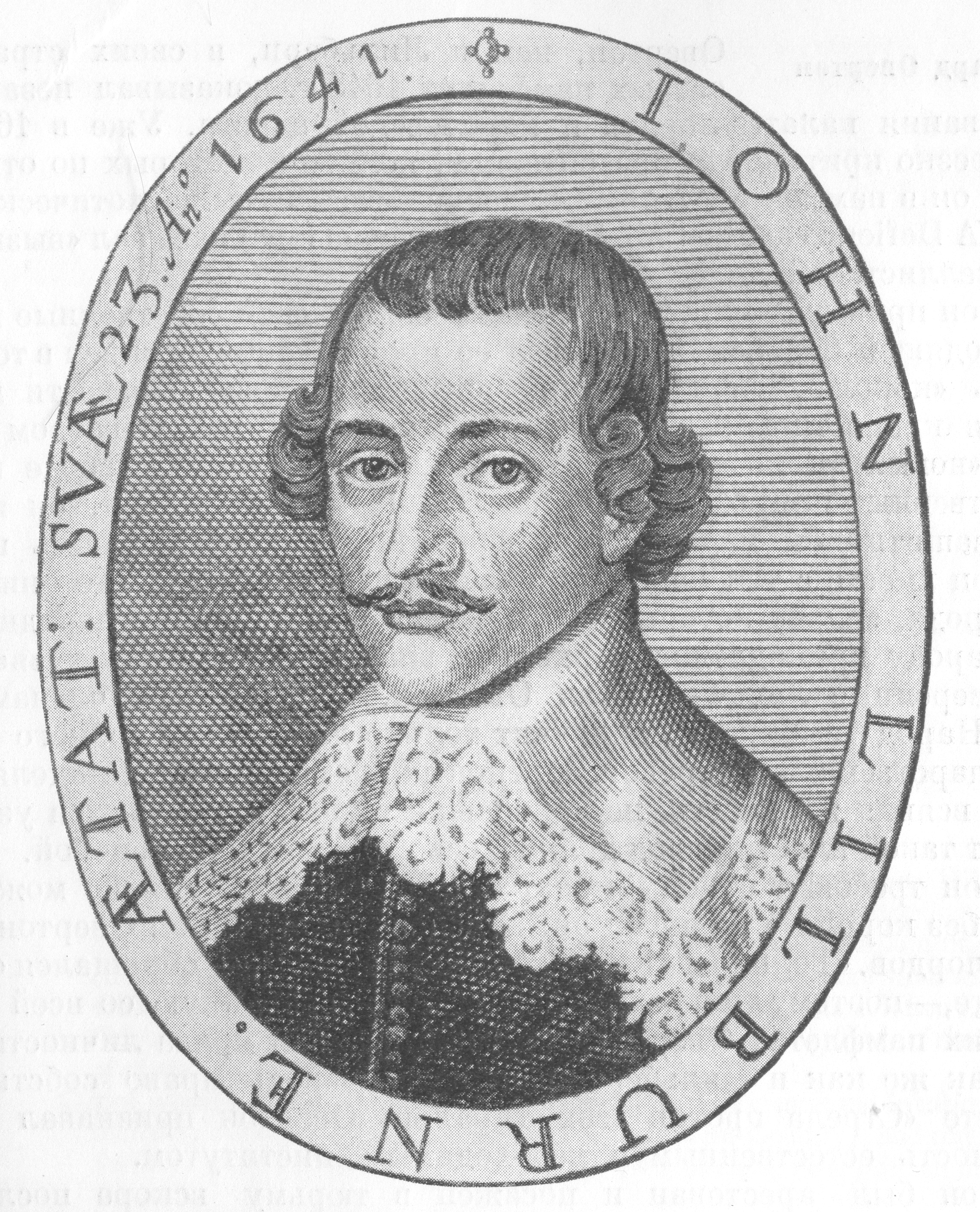
John Lilburne

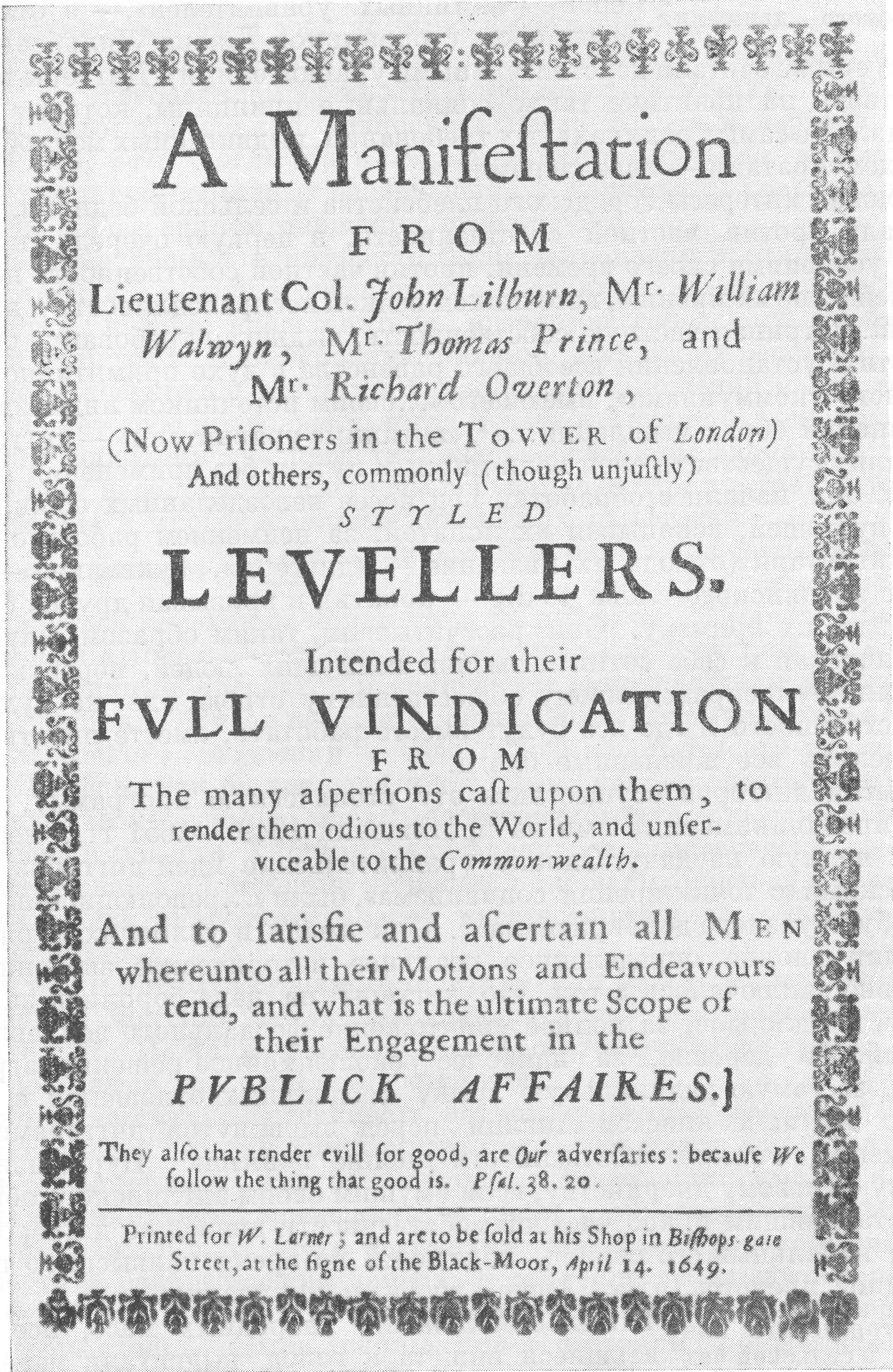
"The Levellers' Manifestation", a pamphlet issued by the four arrested leaders, arguing their case

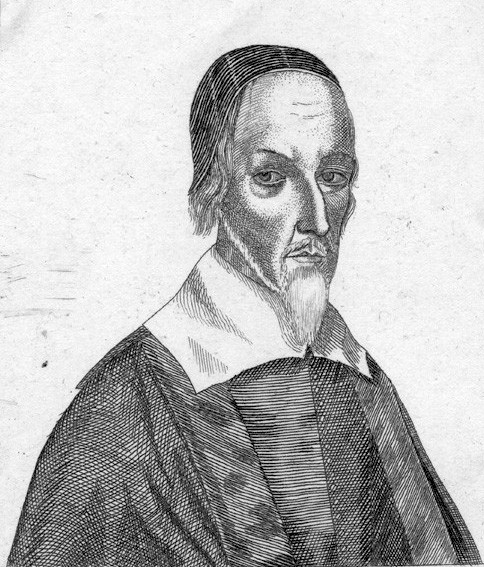
Praise-God Barebone

By this time she had emerged as a leader of Leveller women and seems to have been involved in their petitioning of Parliament. On 29 April 1649 the English Council of State committed to prison the Leveller leaders John Lilburne, Richard Overton, William Walwyn and Thomas Prince, who owned a book critical of the regime, England's New Chains. The House of Commons agreed that they should be tried under Common Law on 11 April. The House was under a constant bombardment of petitions on behalf of the arrested Levellers, and women mobilised in numbers. On 23 April Bulstrode Whitelocke observed:

Some hundreds of women attended the house with a petition on the behalf of Lilburn and the rest; it was reproachful, and almost scolding, and much to the same effect with former petitions for them.

The women were driven off at pistol point, but returned the next day, although they "could not get it received." On 25 April they came to parliament for a third time, when:

The house sent them this answer by the sergeant:
That the matter they petitioned about was of an higher concernment than they understood; that the house gave an answer to their husbands, and therefore desired them to go home, and look after their own business, and meddle with their housewifery.

This patronising answer seems to have provoked their Humble Petition of divers well-affected women of the Cities of London and Westminster, presented on 5 May 1649, which may have been written by Chidley. The Leveller women justified their political activity on the basis of "our creation in the image of God, and of an interest in Christ equal unto men, as also of a proportional share in the freedoms of this Commonwealth." They went on to ask:

Have we not an equal interest with the men of this Nation, in those liberties and securities contained in the Petition of Right, and the other good laws of the land? Are any of our lives, limbs, liberties or goods to be taken from us more than from men, but by due process of law and conviction of twelve sworn men of the neighborhood? And can you imagine us to be so sottish or stupid, as not to perceive, or not to be sensible when daily those strong defenses of our peace and welfare are broken down, and trod under foot by force and arbitrary power?

They went on to point out that the arbitrary treatment of the four Levellers implied they too could be "liable to the same unjust cruelties as they." Public pressure was probably secured the freedom of the four, as they were not released immediately after acquittal.

When John Lilburne found himself on trial again in 1653, Chidley rallied to his defence, organizing a petition to Barebone's Parliament. Edward Hyde, the royalist, was told that it gathered over 6000 female signatures. Hyde heard that "the ringleader was the wife of one Chidley, a prime Leveller." She led a delegation of twelve women to present the petition. Praise-God Barebone himself was sent to meet and dissuade the women but his efforts were in vain. Another member was then sent out to tell them that Parliament could not notice the petition, "they being women and many of them wives, so that the Law tooke no notice of them."

== Family ==
Katherine and Daniel Chidley had the following eight children christened at St Chad's Church, Shrewsbury.

- Samuel, 13 April 1618. He was also a Leveller activist.
- Daniel, 20 August 1620. He was buried 13 June 1621.
- Priscilla (Prissella), 22 April 1622.
- Sarah (Sarra), 11 April 1624.
- Daniel, 12 February 1626.
- Mary, 25 February 1627.
- Joseph, 14 September 1628.
- John, 26 October 1629.

== Death ==
Nothing further of Chidley is documented after 1653 and her date of death is not known.

== Reception and reputation ==
Chidley was famous or notorious enough in her own day for important Puritan controversialists like Edwards and Goodwin to take note, although it is arguable that her full significance was overlooked. Goodwin, for example, used Chidley's gender to belittle Edwards, but never quoted or referred to her work. She remained, however, for more than a century, an author who was known by reputation if not studied. George Ballard, in his 1752 anthology Memoirs of Several Ladies of Great Britain, admitted:

I can trace out but very little concerning this writer; who appears to have been a most violent independent; and to have fought as furiously for that cause, as ever did Penthesilea (the celebrated Amazonian Queen) in defence of the Trojans...

However, he did know and had evidently examined, if not read, The Justification of the Independant Churches, as he describes the volume, although not its arguments. He also knew the report of the Stepney encounter with Greenhill, from the first part of Gangraena, but apparently not the narrative of the Suffolk mission, or anything of her Leveller connections, as he concludes: "Whether she wrote any thing more, or what became of her afterwards, I know not." She apparently merited no entry in the Dictionary of National Biography and only one mention: in the article on her adversary Thomas Edwards.

Socialist historians in the 20th century revived interest in the Levellers and the popular historian and journalist H. N. Brailsford mentioned both Katherine and Samuel Chidley several times in his book on the subject, written in the 1950s. Ian Gentles contributed an important article on the Chidleys to The Journal of Ecclesiastical History in 1978, going on to write the article on Katharine for the Oxford Dictionary of National Biography in 2004. By this time, she was becoming an important subject for Feminist historians. Katharine Gillespie of Miami University, who has sought to give serious weight to Biblical and theological perspectives, edited a facsimile edition of her writings, published in 2009. Interest is not confined to the Left: Chidley's centrality in discussion of the separation of Church and State has brought her to the attention of the Online Library of Liberty, sponsored by the Right Libertarian Liberty Fund, which is in the process of publishing her main works online. The Justification and A New-Yeares-Gift have been made available for free by the Text Creation Partnership in searchable and paginated online versions. As a result of the widespread interest, Chidley is now mentioned in general histories of the 17th century. A notable example, is episode 9 of Simon Schama's BBC History of Britain (at 12:30 minutes into the episode), and the supporting book, which gives consideration to Chidley and Leveller women more generally.
