= Affirmative conclusion from a negative premise =

Logical fallacy

An affirmative conclusion from a negative premise, or an illicit negative, is a formal fallacy that is committed when a categorical syllogism has a positive conclusion and one or two negative premises.

For example:

No fish are dogs, and no dogs can fly, therefore all fish can fly.

The only thing that can be properly inferred from these premises is that some things that are not fish cannot fly, provided that dogs exist.

Or:

We don't read that trash. People who read that trash don't appreciate real literature. Therefore, we appreciate real literature.

This could be illustrated mathematically as

If $A \cap B = \emptyset$ and $B \cap C = \emptyset$ then $A\subset C$.

It is a fallacy because any valid forms of categorical syllogism that assert a negative premise must have a negative conclusion.

== See also ==
- Negative conclusion from affirmative premises, in which a syllogism is invalid because the conclusion is negative yet the premises are affirmative
- Fallacy of exclusive premises, in which a syllogism is invalid because both premises are negative
