= Prosleptic syllogism =

Prosleptic syllogisms (/prəˈslɛptɪk/; from Greek πρόσληψις proslepsis "taking in addition") are a class of syllogisms that use a prosleptic proposition as one of the premises.

The term originated with Theophrastus.

== Figures ==
Prosleptic syllogisms are classified in three figures, or potential arrangements of the terms according to the figure of the prosleptic proposition used.

- First figure: "A is universally predicated of everything that is universally predicated of G"
- Second figure: "Everything predicated universally of A is predicated universally of G"
- Third figure: "A is universally predicated of everything of which G is universally predicated"

Consequently, a third figure prosleptic syllogism would read "A is universally affirmed of everything of which G is universally affirmed; G is universally affirmed of B; therefore, A is universally affirmed of B." ("All G are A; all B are G; therefore, all B are A" or "Statement A is always true of everything for which statement G is always true; statement G is true of all things B; therefore, statement A is true of all things B.")

== See also ==
- Type of syllogism (disjunctive, hypothetical, legal, poly-, prosleptic, quasi-, statistical)
