= Illicit minor =

Type of formal fallacy in syllogism

An Euler diagram showing an illicit minor, where the set A is a subset of both B and C, but B is not a subset of C.

Illicit minor is a formal fallacy committed in a categorical syllogism that is invalid because its minor term is undistributed in the minor premise.

This fallacy has the following argument form:

All A are B.
All A are C.
Therefore, all C are B.

Example:

All cats are felines.
All cats are mammals.
Therefore, all mammals are felines.

The minor term here is mammal, which is not distributed in the minor premise "All cats are mammals", because this premise is only defining a property of possibly some mammals (i.e., that they're cats.) However, in the conclusion "All mammals are felines", mammal is distributed (it is talking about all mammals being felines). It is shown to be false by any mammal that is not a feline; for example, a dog.

Example:

Pie is good.
Pie is unhealthy.
Thus, all good things are unhealthy.

== See also ==
- Illicit major
- Syllogistic fallacy
- Association fallacy

This article was originally based on material from the Free On-line Dictionary of Philosophy, which is licensed under the GFDL.
