= Syllogism =

Type of logical argument that applies deductive reasoning

A syllogism (Ancient Greek: συλλογισμός, syllogismos, 'conclusion, inference') is a kind of logical argument that applies deductive reasoning to arrive at a conclusion based on two propositions that are asserted or assumed to be true.

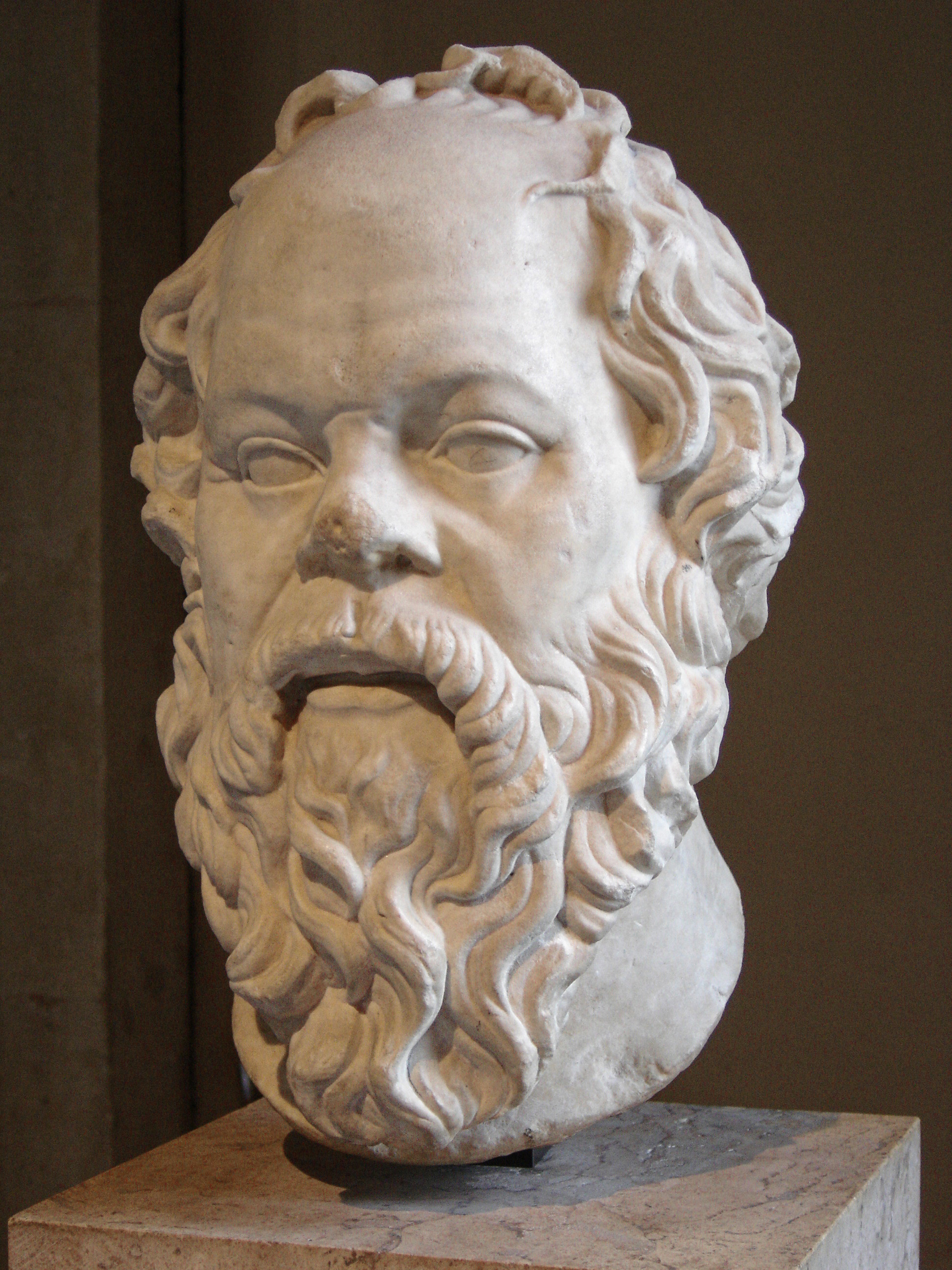
"Socrates" at the Louvre

In its earliest form (defined by Aristotle in his 350 BC book Prior Analytics), a deductive syllogism arises when two true premises (propositions or statements) validly imply a conclusion, or the main point that the argument aims to get across. For example, knowing that all men are mortal (major premise), and that Socrates is a man (minor premise), we may validly conclude that Socrates is mortal. Syllogistic arguments are usually represented in a three-line form:

All men are mortal.
Socrates is a man.
Therefore, Socrates is mortal.

In antiquity, two rival syllogistic theories existed: Aristotelian syllogism and Stoic syllogism. From the Middle Ages onwards, categorical syllogism and syllogism were usually used interchangeably. This article is concerned only with this historical use. The syllogism was at the core of historical deductive reasoning, whereby facts are determined by combining existing statements, in contrast to inductive reasoning, in which facts are predicted by repeated observations. Within some academic contexts, syllogism has been superseded by first-order predicate logic following the work of Gottlob Frege, in particular his Begriffsschrift (Concept Script; 1879). Syllogism, being a method of valid logical reasoning, will always be useful in most circumstances, and for general-audience introductions to logic and clear-thinking.

== Early history ==
In antiquity, two rival syllogistic theories existed: Aristotelian syllogism and Stoic syllogism.

=== Aristotle ===
Aristotle defines the syllogism as

"a discourse in which certain (specific) things having been supposed, something different from the things supposed results of necessity because these things are so."

Despite this very general definition, in Prior Analytics Aristotle limits himself to categorical syllogisms that consist of three categorical propositions, including categorical modal syllogisms.

The use of syllogisms as a tool for understanding can be dated back to the logical reasoning discussions of Aristotle. Before the mid-12th century, medieval logicians were only familiar with a portion of Aristotle's works, including such titles as Categories and On Interpretation, works that contributed heavily to the prevailing Old Logic, or logica vetus. The onset of a New Logic, or logica nova, arose alongside the reappearance of Prior Analytics, the work in which Aristotle developed his theory of the syllogism.

Prior Analytics, upon rediscovery, was instantly regarded by logicians as "a closed and complete body of doctrine", leaving very little for thinkers of the day to debate, and reorganize. Aristotle's theory on the syllogism for assertoric sentences was considered especially remarkable, with only small systematic changes occurring to the concept over time. This theory of the syllogism would not enter the context of the more comprehensive logic of consequence until logic began to be reworked in general in the mid-14th century by the likes of John Buridan.

Aristotle's Prior Analytics did not, however, incorporate such a comprehensive theory on the modal syllogism: a syllogism that has at least one modalized premise, or a premise containing the modal words necessarily, possibly, or contingently. Aristotle's terminology in this aspect of his theory was deemed vague, and in many cases unclear, even contradicting some of his statements from On Interpretation. His original assertions on this specific component of the theory were left up to a considerable amount of conversation, resulting in a wide array of solutions put forth by commentators of the day. The system for modal syllogisms laid forth by Aristotle would ultimately be deemed unfit for practical use, and would be replaced by new distinctions and new theories altogether.

=== Medieval syllogism ===
==== Boethius ====
Boethius (c. 475–526) contributed an effort to make the ancient Aristotelian logic more accessible. While his Latin translation of Prior Analytics went primarily unused before the 12th century, his textbooks on the categorical syllogism were central to expanding the syllogistic discussion. Rather than in any additions that he personally made to the field, Boethius' logical legacy lies in his effective transmission of prior theories to later logicians, as well as his clear and primarily accurate presentations of Aristotle's contributions.

==== Peter Abelard ====
Another of medieval logic's first contributors from the Latin West, Peter Abelard (1079–1142), gave his own thorough evaluation of the syllogism concept, and accompanying theory in the Dialectica—a discussion of logic based on Boethius' commentaries and monographs. His perspective on syllogisms can be found in other works as well, such as Logica Ingredientibus. With the help of Abelard's distinction between de dicto modal sentences and de re modal sentences, medieval logicians began to shape a more coherent concept of Aristotle's modal syllogism model.

==== Jean Buridan ====
The French philosopher Jean Buridan (c. 1300 – 1361), whom some consider the foremost logician of the later Middle Ages, contributed two significant works: Treatise on Consequence and Summulae de Dialectica, in which he discussed the concept of the syllogism, its components and distinctions, and ways to use the tool to expand its logical capability. For 200 years after Buridan's discussions, little was said about syllogistic logic. Historians of logic have assessed that the primary changes in the post-Middle Age era were changes in respect to the public's awareness of original sources, a lessening of appreciation for the logic's sophistication and complexity, and an increase in logical ignorance—so that logicians of the early 20th century came to view the whole system as ridiculous.

== Modern history ==
The Aristotelian syllogism dominated Western philosophical thought for many centuries. Syllogism itself is about drawing valid conclusions from assumptions (axioms), rather than about verifying the assumptions. However, people over time focused on the logic aspect, forgetting the importance of verifying the assumptions.

In the 17th century, Francis Bacon emphasized that experimental verification of axioms must be carried out rigorously, and cannot take syllogism itself as the best way to draw conclusions in nature. Bacon proposed a more inductive approach to the observation of nature, which involves experimentation, and leads to discovering and building on axioms to create a more general conclusion. Yet, a full method of drawing conclusions in nature is not the scope of logic or syllogism, and the inductive method was covered in Aristotle's subsequent treatise, the Posterior Analytics.

In the 19th century, modifications to syllogism were incorporated to deal with disjunctive ("A or B") and conditional ("if A then B") statements. Immanuel Kant famously claimed, in Logic (1800), that logic was the one completed science, and that Aristotelian logic more or less included everything about logic that there was to know. (This work is not necessarily representative of Kant's mature philosophy, which is often regarded as an innovation to logic itself.) Kant's opinion stood unchallenged in the West until 1879, when Gottlob Frege published his Begriffsschrift (Concept Script). This introduced a calculus, a method of representing categorical statements (and statements that are not provided for in syllogism as well) by the use of quantifiers and variables.

A noteworthy exception is the logic developed in Bernard Bolzano's work Wissenschaftslehre (Theory of Science, 1837), the principles of which were applied as a direct critique of Kant, in the posthumously published work New Anti-Kant (1850). The work of Bolzano had been largely overlooked until the late 20th century, among other reasons, because of the intellectual environment at the time in Bohemia, which was then part of the Austrian Empire. In the last 20 years, Bolzano's work has resurfaced and become subject of both translation and contemporary study. One notable exception to this modern relegation is the continued application of Aristotelian logic by officials of the Congregation for the Doctrine of the Faith, and the Apostolic Tribunal of the Roman Rota, which still requires that any arguments crafted by Advocates be presented in syllogistic format.

=== Boole's acceptance of Aristotle ===
George Boole's unwavering acceptance of Aristotle's logic is emphasized by the historian of logic John Corcoran in an accessible introduction to Laws of Thought. Corcoran also wrote a point-by-point comparison of Prior Analytics and Laws of Thought. According to Corcoran, Boole fully accepted and endorsed Aristotle's logic. Boole's goals were "to go under, over, and beyond" Aristotle's logic by:

1. providing it with mathematical foundations involving equations;
2. extending the class of problems it could treat, as solving equations was added to assessing validity; and
3. expanding the range of applications it could handle, such as expanding propositions of only two terms to those having arbitrarily many.

More specifically, Boole agreed with what Aristotle said; Boole's 'disagreements', if they might be called that, concern what Aristotle did not say. First, in the realm of foundations, Boole reduced Aristotle's four propositional forms to one form, the form of equations, which by itself was a revolutionary idea. Second, in the realm of logic's problems, Boole's addition of equation solving to logic—another revolutionary idea—involved Boole's doctrine that Aristotle's rules of inference (the "perfect syllogisms") must be supplemented by rules for equation solving. Third, in the realm of applications, Boole's system could handle multi-term propositions and arguments, whereas Aristotle could handle only two-termed subject-predicate propositions and arguments. For example, Aristotle's system could not deduce: "No quadrangle that is a square is a rectangle that is a rhombus" from "No square that is a quadrangle is a rhombus that is a rectangle" or from "No rhombus that is a rectangle is a square that is a quadrangle."

== Types ==
A syllogism consists of three parts: two premises and a conclusion. The interactions of these three parts vary depending on the type of syllogism. The three main types of syllogisms are categorical syllogisms, hypothetical syllogisms, and disjunctive syllogisms. A polysyllogism is an extended argument consisting of multiple, overlapping syllogisms in which the conclusion of one syllogism becomes a premise of a subsequent syllogism.

=== Categorical ===
The most common type of syllogism is a categorical syllogism, and it consists of three parts:

1. Major premise
2. Minor premise
3. Conclusion

Each part is a categorical proposition, and each categorical proposition contains two categorical terms. In Aristotle, each of the premises is in the form "All S are P," "Some S are P", "No S are P" or "Some S are not P", where "S" is the subject-term and "P" is the predicate-term:

- "All S are P," and "No S are P" are termed universal propositions;
- "Some S are P" and "Some S are not P" are termed particular propositions.

Each of the premises has one term in common with the conclusion: in a major premise, this is the major term (i.e., the predicate of the conclusion); in a minor premise, this is the minor term (i.e., the subject of the conclusion). For example:

Major premise: All humans are mortal.
Minor premise: All Greeks are humans.
Conclusion/Consequent: All Greeks are mortal.

Each of the three distinct terms represents a category. From the example above, humans, mortal, and Greeks: mortal is the major term, and Greeks the minor term. The premises also have one term in common with each other, which is known as the middle term; in this example, humans. Both of the premises are universal, as is the conclusion.

Major premise: All mortals die.
Minor premise: All men are mortals.
Conclusion/Consequent: All men die.

Here, the major term is die, the minor term is men, and the middle term is mortals. Again, both premises are universal, hence so is the conclusion.

Most logicians consider a singular proposition to be a subtype of universal proposition in which a category is limited to a single member. As such, a syllogism with a singular proposition is still considered a categorical syllogism by most logicians. For example:

Major premise: All men are mortal.
Minor premise: Socrates is a man.
Conclusion/Consequent: Socrates is a mortal.

Here the major term is mortal, the minor term is Socrates, and the middle term is men. All of the premises are universal propositions. The universality of the major premise is clear because the phrase "all men" is written to clearly indicate what the category is (men) and that the entirety of the category is encompassed (all). Although the minor premise Socrates is a man contains a singular minor term (Socrates) and thus may not appear to be a universal proposition, it can be rewritten to a logically equivalent form that makes its universality clear: Socrates, who is the entirety of his own category, is a mortal. Because of the ability to convert a singular proposition into a universal proposition, most logicians consider a syllogism with a singular proposition to be a categorical syllogism; however, some logicians may refer to it as a quasi-syllogism.

=== Hypothetical ===
A hypothetical syllogism, also called a conditional syllogism, is a syllogism that includes a conditional statement for one or both of its premises. A conditional statement takes the form "If P, then Q." A pure hypothetical syllogism includes conditional statements in both of the premises; a mixed hypothetical syllogism includes a conditional statement in only one premise.

=== Disjunctive ===
A disjunctive syllogism includes a disjunctive statement for one of its premises. A disjunctive statement takes the form "Either P or Q."

=== Polysyllogism ===
A polysyllogism, or a sorites, is a form of extended argument that includes multiple, overlapping syllogisms. In a polysyllogism, the conclusion of one syllogism becomes a premise in a subsequent syllogism. The final syllogism in the series provides the argument's final conclusion. The conclusions of the intermediate syllogisms might not be stated explicitly; in these instances, the series of syllogisms is arranged so that the predicate of each premise forms the subject of the next until the subject of the first is joined with the predicate of the last in the conclusion. For example, one might argue that all lions are big cats, all big cats are predators, and all predators are carnivores. To conclude that therefore all lions are carnivores is to construct a sorites argument.

== Subtypes of categorical syllogisms ==
Relationships between the four types of propositions in the square of opposition (Black areas are empty, red areas are nonempty.)

There are infinitely many possible categorical syllogisms, but only 256 logically distinct types and only 24 valid types (enumerated below). A categorical syllogism takes the form (note: M – Middle, S – subject, P – predicate.):

Major premise: All M are P.
Minor premise: All S are M.
Conclusion/Consequent: All S are P.

The premises and conclusion of a syllogism can be any of four types, which are labeled by letters as follows. The meaning of the letters is given by the table:

code	quantifier	subject	copula	predicate	type	example
A	All	S	are	P	universal affirmative	All humans are mortal.
E	No	S	are	P	universal negative	No humans are perfect.
I	Some	S	are	P	particular affirmative	Some humans are healthy.
O	Some	S	are not	P	particular negative	Some humans are not old.

In Prior Analytics, Aristotle uses mostly the letters A, B, and C (Greek letters alpha, beta, and gamma) as term placeholders, rather than giving concrete examples. It is traditional to use is rather than are as the copula, hence All A is B rather than All As are Bs. It is traditional and convenient practice to use a, e, i, o as infix operators so the categorical statements can be written succinctly. The following table shows the longer form, the succinct shorthand, and equivalent expressions in predicate logic:

Form	Shorthand	Predicate logic
All A are B	AaB	$\forall x. A(x) \rightarrow B(x)$ or $\neg \exist x. A(x) \land \neg B(x)$
No A are B	AeB	$\neg \exist x. A(x) \land B(x)$ or $\forall x. A(x) \rightarrow \neg B(x)$
Some A are B	AiB	$\exist x. A(x) \land B(x)$
Some A are not B	AoB	$\exist x. A(x) \land \neg B(x)$

The convention here is that the letter S is the subject of the conclusion, P is the predicate of the conclusion, and M is the middle term. The major premise links M with P and the minor premise links M with S. However, the middle term can be either the subject or the predicate of each premise where it appears. The differing positions of the major, minor, and middle terms gives rise to another classification of syllogisms known as the figure. Given that in each case the conclusion is S-P, the four figures are:

	Figure 1	Figure 2	Figure 3	Figure 4
Major premise	M–P	P–M	M–P	P–M
Minor premise	S–M	S–M	M–S	M–S

(Note, however, that following Aristotle's treatment of the figures, some logicians, such as Peter Abelard and Jean Buridan, do not regard the fourth figure as distinct from the first.)

Putting it all together, there are 256 possible types of syllogisms (or 512 if the order of the major and minor premises is changed, though this makes no difference logically). Each premise and the conclusion can be of type A, E, I or O, and the syllogism can be any of the four figures. A syllogism can be described briefly by giving the letters for the premises and conclusion followed by the number for the figure. For example, the syllogism BARBARA below is AAA-1, or "A-A-A in the first figure".

The vast majority of the 256 possible forms of syllogism are invalid (the conclusion does not follow logically from the premises). The table below shows the valid forms. Even some of these are sometimes considered to commit the existential fallacy, meaning they are invalid if they mention an empty category. These controversial patterns are marked in italics. All but four of the patterns in italics (felapton, darapti, fesapo and bamalip) are weakened moods, i.e. it is possible to draw a stronger conclusion from the premises.

Figure 1	Figure 2	Figure 3	Figure 4
Barbara	Cesare	Datisi	Calemes
Celarent	Camestres	Disamis	Dimatis
Darii	Festino	Ferison	Fresison
Ferio	Baroco	Bocardo	Calemos
Barbari	Cesaro	Felapton	Fesapo
Celaront	Camestros	Darapti	Bamalip

The letters A, E, I, and O have been used since the medieval Schools to form mnemonic names for the forms as follows: 'Barbara' stands for AAA, 'Celarent' for EAE, etc. Next to each premise and conclusion is a shorthand description of the sentence. So in AAI-3, the premise "All squares are rectangles" becomes "MaP"; the symbols mean that the first term ("square") is the middle term, the second term ("rectangle") is the predicate of the conclusion, and the relationship between the two terms is labeled "a" (All M are P).

The following table shows all syllogisms that are essentially different. The similar syllogisms share the same premises, just written in a different way. For example "Some pets are kittens" (SiM in Darii) could also be written as "Some kittens are pets" (MiS in Datisi). In the Venn diagrams, the black areas indicate no elements, and the red areas indicate at least one element. In the predicate logic expressions, a horizontal bar over an expression means to negate ("logical not") the result of that expression. It is also possible to use graphs (consisting of vertices and edges) to evaluate syllogisms.

=== Examples ===
M: men S: Greeks P: mortal

==== Barbara (AAA-1) ====
All men are mortal. (MaP)
All Greeks are men. (SaM)
∴ All Greeks are mortal. (SaP)

M: reptile S: snake P: fur

==== Celarent (EAE-1) ====
Similar: Cesare (EAE-2)

No reptile has fur. (MeP)
All snakes are reptiles. (SaM)
∴ No snake has fur. (SeP)

Camestres (AEE-2)

M: reptile S: fur P: snake

Camestres is essentially like Celarent with S and P exchanged.
Similar: Calemes (AEE-4)

All snakes are reptiles. (PaM)
No fur bearing animal is a reptile. (SeM)
∴ No fur bearing animal is a snake. (SeP)

M: rabbit S: pet P: fur

==== Darii (AII-1) ====
Similar: Datisi (AII-3)

All rabbits have fur. (MaP)
Some pets are rabbits. (SiM)
∴ Some pets have fur. (SiP)

Disamis (IAI-3)

M: rabbit S: fur P: pet

Disamis is essentially like Darii with S and P exchanged.
Similar: Dimatis (IAI-4)

Some rabbits are pets. (MiP)
All rabbits have fur. (MaP)
∴ Some fur bearing animals are pets. (SiP)

M: homework S: reading P: fun

==== Ferio (EIO-1) ====
Similar: Festino (EIO-2), Ferison (EIO-3), Fresison (EIO-4)

No homework is fun. (MeP)
Some reading is homework. (SiM)
∴ Some reading is not fun. (SoP)

M: mammal S: pet P: cat

==== Baroco (AOO-2) ====
All cats are mammals. (PaM)
Some pets are not mammals. (SoM)
∴ Some pets are not cats. (SoP)

M: cat S: mammal P: pet

==== Bocardo (OAO-3) ====
Some cats are not pets. (MoP)
All cats are mammals. (MaS)
∴ Some mammals are not pets. (SoP)

M: man S: Greek P: mortal

==== Barbari (AAI-1) ====
All men are mortal. (MaP)
All Greeks are men and some Greeks exist (SaM)
∴ Some Greeks are mortal. (SiP)

Bamalip (AAI-4)

M: man S: mortal P: Greek

Bamalip is exactly like Barbari with S and P exchanged:

All Greeks are men. (PaM)
All men are mortals and some men exist(MaS)
∴ Some mortals are Greek. (SiP)

M: reptile S: snake P: fur

==== Celaront (EAO-1) ====
Similar: Cesaro (EAO-2)

No reptiles have fur. (MeP)
All snakes are reptiles. (SaM)
∴ Some snakes have no fur. (SoP)

M: hooves S: human P: horse

==== Camestros (AEO-2) ====
Similar: Calemos (AEO-4)

All horses have hooves. (PaM)
No humans have hooves. (SeM)
∴ Some humans are not horses. (SoP)

M: flower S: plant P: animal

==== Felapton (EAO-3) ====
Similar: Fesapo (EAO-4)

No flowers are animals. (MeP)
All flowers are plants. (MaS)
∴ Some plants are not animals. (SoP)

M: square S: rhomb P: rectangle

==== Darapti (AAI-3) ====
All squares are rectangles. (MaP)
All squares are rhombuses. (MaS)
∴ Some rhombuses are rectangles. (SiP)

=== Table of all syllogisms ===
This table shows all 24 valid syllogisms, represented by Venn diagrams. Columns indicate similarity, and are grouped by combinations of premises. Borders correspond to conclusions. Those with an existential assumption are dashed.

Table of all 24 valid syllogisms
	A ∧ A		A ∧ E				A ∧ I		A ∧ O		E ∧ I
1	Barbara	Barbari			Celarent	Celaront	Darii				Ferio
2			Camestres	Camestros	Cesare	Cesaro			Baroco		Festino
3		Darapti				Felapton	Datisi	Disamis		Bocardo	Ferison
4		Bamalip	Calemes	Calemos		Fesapo		Dimatis			Fresison

== Syllogistic fallacies ==
People often make mistakes when reasoning syllogistically. A formal fallacy, also called a non-sequitur or syllogistic fallacy, is a pattern of reasoning with a flaw in its logical structure, that is, the relationship between the premises and the conclusion. For instance, from the premises some A are B, some B are C, people tend to come to a definitive conclusion that therefore some A are C. However, this does not follow according to the rules of classical logic. For instance, while some cats (A) are black things (B), and some black things (B) are televisions (C), it does not follow from the parameters that some cats (A) are televisions (C). This is because in the structure of the syllogism invoked (i.e. III-1) the middle term is not distributed in either the major premise or in the minor premise, a pattern called the "fallacy of the undistributed middle". Because of this, it can be hard to follow formal logic, and a closer eye is needed in order to ensure that an argument is, in fact, valid.

Determining the validity of a syllogism involves determining the distribution of each term in each statement, meaning whether all members of that term are accounted for. In categorical syllogisms, formal fallacies include:

- Undistributed middle: Neither of the premises accounts for all members of the middle term, which consequently fails to link the major and minor term.
- Illicit treatment of the major term: The conclusion implicates all members of the major term (P – meaning the proposition is negative); however, the major premise does not account for them all (i.e., P is either an affirmative predicate or a particular subject there).
- Illicit treatment of the minor term: Same as above, but for the minor term (S – meaning the proposition is universal) and minor premise (where S is either a particular subject or an affirmative predicate).
- Exclusive premises: Both premises are negative, meaning no link is established between the major and minor terms.
- Affirmative conclusion from a negative premise: If either premise is negative, the conclusion must also be.
- Negative conclusion from affirmative premises: If both premises are affirmative, the conclusion must also be.

Hypothetical and disjunctive syllogisms are subject to formal fallacies called propositional fallacies. In hypothetical syllogisms, such fallacies include:

- Affirming the consequent – the antecedent in an indicative conditional is claimed to be true because the consequent is true; if A, then B; B, therefore A.
- Denying the antecedent – the consequent in an indicative conditional is claimed to be false because the antecedent is false; if A, then B; not A, therefore not B.

In disjunctive syllogisms, a fallacy occurs when affirming a disjunct – concluding that one disjunct of a logical disjunction must be false because the other disjunct is true; A or B; A, therefore not B.

== Other types ==
- Enthymeme – a "truncated" syllogism with an unstated premise
- Legal syllogism – a syllogism used in the context of legal reasoning
- Prosleptic syllogism
- Statistical syllogism – not a true deductive syllogism, but a form of inductive reasoning that resembles a syllogism

== See also ==
- Argumentation theory
- Buddhist logico-epistemology
- Decidable sublanguages of set theory – some are called syllogistics
- The False Subtlety of the Four Syllogistic Figures
- Tautology (logic)
- Venn diagram
