= Illicit major =

Formal fallacy

Illicit major is a formal fallacy committed in a categorical syllogism that is invalid because its major term is undistributed in the major premise.

This fallacy has the following argument form:

1. All A are B
2. No C are A
3. Therefore, no C are B

Example:

1. All dogs are mammals
2. No cats are dogs
3. Therefore, no cats are mammals

In this argument, the major term is "mammals". This is distributed in the conclusion (the last statement) because we are making a claim about a property of all mammals: that they are not cats. However, it is not distributed in the major premise (the first statement) where we are only talking about a property of some mammals: Only some mammals are dogs.

The error is in assuming that the converse of the first statement (that all mammals are dogs) is also true.

However, an argument in the following form differs from the above, and is valid (Camestres):

1. All A are B
2. No B are C
3. Therefore, no C are A

== See also ==
- Illicit minor
- Syllogistic fallacy
