= Corkbush Field =

Field in Hertfordshire, England

Coordinates: 51.801954°N 0.050711°W

- Location within Hertfordshire
- Population: 18,000
- OS grid reference: TL3450413276
- Civil parish: Ware
- District: East Hertfordshire
- Shire county: Hertfordshire
- Region: East
- Country: England
- Sovereign state: United Kingdom
- Police: Hertfordshire
- Fire: Hertfordshire
- Ambulance: East of England

Corkbush Field is the land to the east of Hertford along the Ware road, lying between the King's Meads at the bottom of the valley of the River Lea and the higher ground to the south known as Barrow Green Common. It is alternatively known as Cockbush Field in some sources as the 'r' and 'c' are similar in some 17th Century handwriting. It was the site of the Ware Mutiny, also known as the Corkbush Field Mutiny of 15 November 1647.

== See also ==
- Corkbush Field Mutiny
- Ware, Hertfordshire
- English Civil War
- Banbury mutiny
