= Burlton =

Village in Shropshire, England

Coordinates: 52.829°N 2.806°W

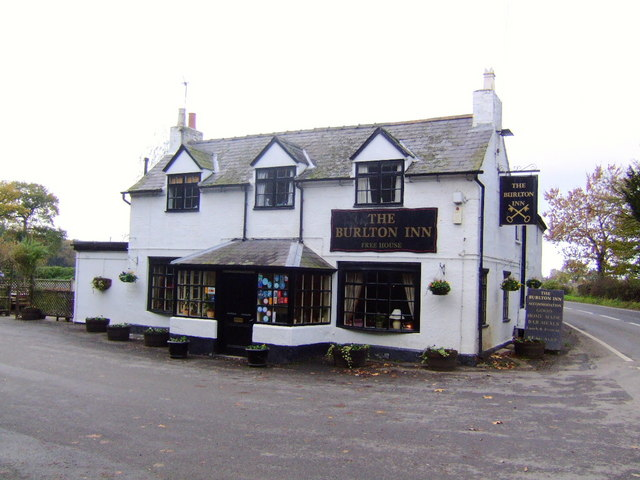
- The Burlton Inn in Burlton, Shropshire

- Location within Shropshire
- OS grid reference: SJ457260
- Civil parish: Loppington
- Unitary authority: Shropshire
- Ceremonial county: Shropshire
- Region: West Midlands
- Country: England
- Sovereign state: United Kingdom
- Post town: SHREWSBURY
- Postcode district: SY4
- Dialling code: 01939
- Police: West Mercia
- Fire: Shropshire
- Ambulance: West Midlands
- UK Parliament: North Shropshire

Burlton is a village in Shropshire, England.
