= Appeal to the stone =

Logical fallacy

Appeal to the stone, also known as argumentum ad lapidem, is a logical fallacy that dismisses an argument as untrue or absurd. The dismissal is made by stating or reiterating that the argument is absurd, without providing further argumentation. This theory is closely tied to proof by assertion due to the lack of evidence behind the statement and its attempt to persuade without providing any evidence.

Appeal to the stone is a logical fallacy. Specifically, it is an informal fallacy, which means that it relies on inductive reasoning in an argument to justify an assertion. Informal fallacies contain erroneous reasoning in content of the argument and not the form or structure of it, as opposed to formal fallacies, which contain erroneous reasoning in argument form.

== History ==
=== Origin ===
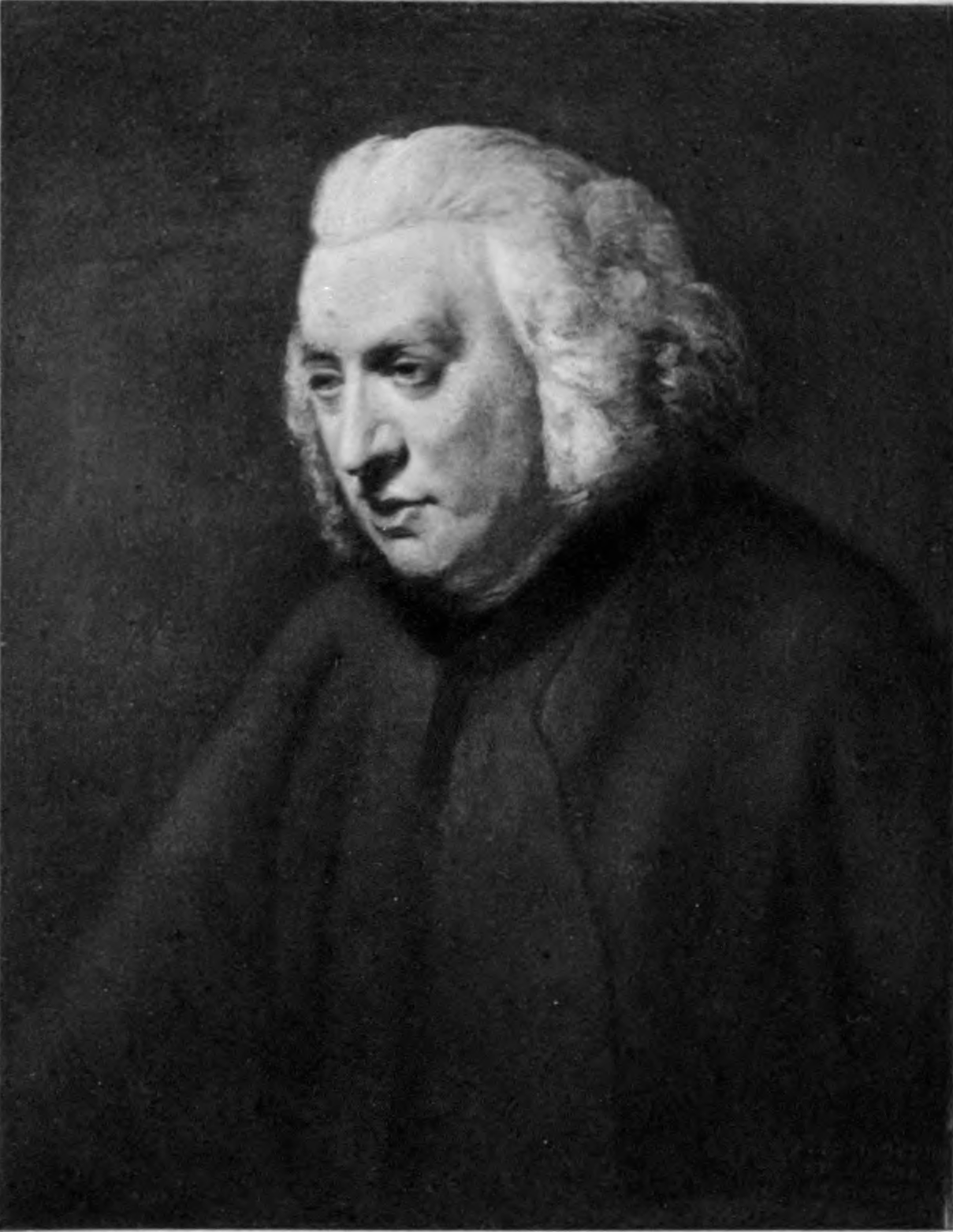
Dr. Samuel Johnson, originator of the appeal to the stone

The name "appeal to the stone" originates from an argument between Dr. Samuel Johnson and James Boswell over George Berkeley's theory of subjective idealism (known previously as "immaterialism"). Subjective idealism states that reality is dependent on a person's perceptions of the world and that material objects are intertwined with one's perceptions of these material objects.

After we came out of the church, we stood talking for some time together of Bishop Berkeley's ingenious sophistry to prove the non-existence of matter, and that every thing in the universe is merely ideal. I observed, that though we are satisfied his doctrine is not true, it is impossible to refute it. I never shall forget the alacrity with which Johnson answered, striking his foot with mighty force against a large stone, till he rebounded from it, "I refute it thus."

— James Boswell, The Life of Samuel Johnson

Johnson's intent, apparently, was to imply that it was absurd of Berkeley to call such a stone "immaterial," when in fact Johnson could kick it with his foot. Others, however, have defended Johnson for making a valid and subtler philosophical point than is often realized.

== Classification ==
=== Informal logical fallacies ===
Informal logical fallacies are misconceptions derived from faulty reasoning. Informal logical fallacies use inductive reasoning and thus can cause errors in reasoning by creating the illusion of a sound argument when it is not sound.

=== Fallacy of irrelevance ===
Irrelevant conclusions, also known as ignoratio elenchi (Latin for "ignoring the list" or "ignoring refutation") or missing the point, follows a similar structure to appeal to the stone. As an informal fallacy, it may not be valid or sound in its reasoning. Irrelevant conclusions hold similarity to appeal to the stone because it provides evidence towards a conclusion that has already been formed about the subject matter being debated, instead of the original subject that was being discussed. Dr. Samuel Johnson’s refutation of Bishop Berkeley’s theory of immaterialism by kicking a stone did not actually address the theory, but rather asserted a conclusion incompatible with the theory and then echoed his conclusion without discussing the subject matter of the theory of immaterialism directly.

=== Inductive reasoning ===
Appeal to the stone utilizes inductive reasoning to derive its argument. Formal fallacies use deductive reasoning and formal properties to structure an argument and inductive arguments do not use this structure. Inductive reasoning is reasoning with uncertain conclusions because of inferences made about a specific situation, object, or event. In the context of Appeal to the stone, inductive reasoning is asserted against an initial claim without further elaboration. Inductive arguments can be affected by the acquisition of new information or evidence that can debunk an inductive assumption.

Inductive reasoning asserts that the probability of a conclusion being correct is adequate evidence to support the argument. Inductive arguments are judged on the strength or weakness of an argument and an argument's strength is subjective to each participant based on preconceptions about the subject being discussed.

The weakness of inductive reasoning (in comparison to deductive reasoning) lies in the inability to gauge the validity or soundness of claims within an argument. Validity of an argument is based on whether the information presented is factual. However, if evidence presented to prove a conclusion are false, this can provide a valid argument based on false information to substantiate the conclusion. Therefore, soundness of an argument is deemed when the assumptions of an argument are factual. Unlike deductive reasoning, inductive arguments cannot prove their deductive validity and therefore lead to the problem of induction.

== Structure of arguments ==
Arguments are typically structured by a claim being defended with reasoning and evidence. It typically consists of statements that provide premises to support a conclusion. In the case of appeal to the stone, there is an explicit conclusion but it is likely not substantiated with many premises to validate the conclusion being asserted.

According to the theory of argumentation, there must be assumptions or premises that follow a method of reasoning or deduction to form the conclusion or point. An appeal to the stone's lack of evidence to substantiate the rejection of the initial claim puts the burden of proof on the other member of the argument and limits rebuttals.

== Criticisms ==
=== Restricted debate ===
In contrast to the burden of proof, appeal to the stone does not allow for debate past the dismissal of the first claim. Therefore, the burden of proof is placed upon the person who made the initial statement to prove it is correct. However, when appeal to the stone is used to argue, there is a diminished ability for a person to create a rebuttal due to lack of elaboration on why there has been a disagreement. Additionally, the appeal to the stone technique is often paired with other logical fallacies that restrict the ability to further dialogue. Participants presenting an appeal to the stone argument may use ad-hominem attacks to avoid the topic of discussion, or may pair it with a straw-man argument to discredit the other participant.

=== Two systems theory ===
The two systems theory, by Israeli psychologist Daniel Kahneman in his book Thinking, Fast and Slow, explains the reasoning behind illogical fallacies. In the two systems theory, decision-making is categorized into system 1 and system 2. System 1 decision-making only uses quick and usually heuristic based interpretations to aid in low-engagement decisions. System 2 decision-making uses more deliberate and rational consideration when creating a conclusion.

Many illogical fallacies employ quick judgement based on emotion to create conclusions in system 1 type decision-making. However, by having a skeptical mindset on one’s own conclusions and engaging in methodological thinking, one can avoid an illogical fallacy.

=== Toulmin's argumentation framework ===
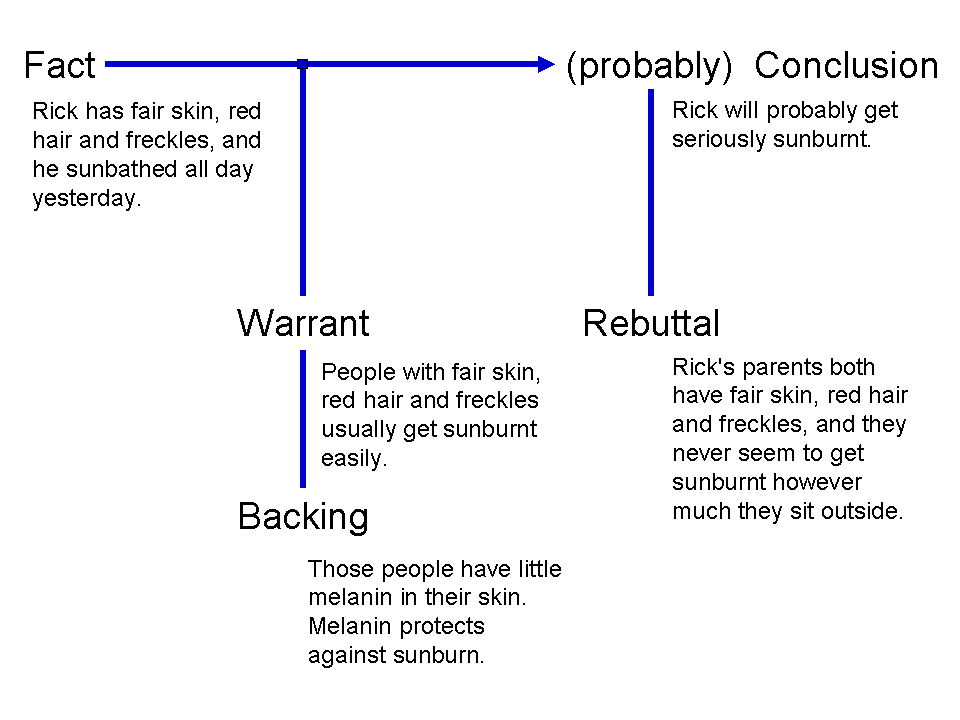
Toulmin argumentation framework example

As demonstrated in Toulmin’s argumentation framework, the grounds of an assumption require warrant and backing to legitimize the claim and prove the soundness of the conclusion. The framework involves a claim, grounds, warrant, qualifier, rebuttal, and backing. The initial claim of an argument is the assertion that the arguer is trying to confirm to another member in an argument. The grounds of an argument are the evidence to support the initial assertion. The warrant are the assumptions that are being used to connect the grounds to the claim. Backing is any additional supporting evidence to prove a claim and to support the warrant. Qualifiers are used to show that a claim may not always be correct (such as: sometimes, rather, somewhat) to show that the claim may not always apply to every situation. Finally, a rebuttal provides another member in a discussion to propose another valid claim for the argument.

In an appeal to the stone, there is only grounds and claims without providing valid warrants or backing to substantiate their claim. Furthermore, appeals to the stone typically do not use qualifiers, limiting the scope of a rebuttal. Without providing valid evidence in an appeal to the stone, it is difficult to provide a rebuttal to the claim.

== Similar theories ==
=== Reductio ad absurdum ===
Appeal to the stone shares similarities in structure to reductio ad absurdum (Latin for “reduction to absurdity”) which states that an argument's assumptions or methods will lead to absurd conclusions. Although appeal to the stone does not explicitly state that an initial statement is absurd, a rejection of the initial claim oftentimes presumes that the initial claim is incorrect or absurd. Reductio ad absurdum makes the assertion that if an initial claim is true, then some other absurd conclusion must also be true.

=== Begging the question ===
Begging the question, also called petitio principii, is a conclusion based on an assumption that requires further proof or elaboration to be validated. Begging the question, is more formally synonymous with “ignoring a question under the assumption it has already been answered.” Begging the question often creates further questioning and colloquial use of this theory has been repurposed to mean “a question that begs to be answered”.

=== Ad nauseam ===
Ad nauseam is Latin and is associated with repeating something to a sickening or excessive degree. This fallacy can be used in arguments to by asserting an opinion on a subject matter to an excessive degree. In an appeal to the stone, with a lack of evidence to support a rejection of a claim, it can likely lead to an ad nauseam argument. If an argument with an appeal to the stone cannot be resolved, it will likely lead to both parties arguing until they are bored of the discussion and cannot come to a satisfactory conclusion.

=== Denialism ===
Denialism is a rejection of facts and reality even when there is strong evidence. Those using denialism are likely using it with ulterior motives such as self-interests or to avoid an uncomfortable truth. The most common way to rebut a denial is through debunking by dissecting the root of the belief and providing evidence to disprove their idea, point by point.

== See also ==
- Ad hominem
- Solvitur ambulando
- Ignoratio elenchi
- Appeal to ridicule
- Argumentum ad baculum
- Proof by assertion
- I'm entitled to my opinion
- Red herring
