= Armorial of the First French Empire =

Coat of Arms of the First French Empire

See also: Armorial du Premier Empire (fr)

Below is a list which presents and describes of the coat of arms of the Nobility of the First French Empire in France between 1804 and 1814, and 1815.

Note: all information is from each respective coat of arms' pages regarding their description, correct positions, etc.

== Emperor of the French ==
Birth (French) Name	Local name	Noble Title	Subsidiary titles	Coat of Arms	Grand Arms	Portrait	Term begin	Date end	Description
Napoléon Bonaparte	Napoléon I	Emperor of the French, King of Italy (see below), Protector of the Confederation of the Rhine (12 July 1806 – 19 October 1813), and Mediator of the Swiss Confederation (19 February 1803 – 19 October 1813)	Co-Prince of Andorra (from 1806), Grand Duke of Berg and Cleves (from 1809)				18 May 1804	11 April 1814	Azure, an Eagle Or, head facing to the sinister, clutching in its talons a Thunderbolt Or.
Napoléon Bonaparte	Napoléon I	King of Italy		Arms of the Napoleonic Kingdom of Italy		Napoleon I of France by Andrea Appiani	17 March 1805	11 April 1814	An escutcheon, with a silver pale charged with the blue Milanic serpent (spitting out the first human for the Duchy of Milan). Both sides of the pale are divided horizontally. The upper right field shows the papal parasol with the keys of Saint Peter. The upper left shows the Venetian lion, but without bible and with a Phrygian cap (revolutionary symbol) on its head (for the Papal States). The lower right quarter shows the white eagle of the house of Este (for the Duchy of Modena) and the lower left shows the arms of Piemonte, but under to the right charged with a silver tower (for Rovigo and Feltre (for the Republic of Venice)). The shield is charged with an escutcheon showing the Iron Crown of Lombardy (with pinnacles (for the Ligurian Republic) in a red border with silver rings.
Napoléon Bonaparte	Napoléon I	Sovereign Prince of Elba					13 April 1814	26 February 1815 (Note: Napoleon left Elba on 26 February, however the title wasn't disestablished until 9 June.)	Argent, on a bend Gules three bees Or.
Napoléon Bonaparte	Napoléon I	Emperor of the French	Co-Prince of Andorra				20 March 1815	22 June 1815	Azure, an Eagle Or, head facing to the sinister, clutching in its talons a Thunderbolt Or.
Napoléon François Joseph Charles Bonaparte	Napoléon II	Emperor of the French	Co-Prince of Andorra				22 June 1815	7 July 1815	Azure, an Eagle Or, head facing to the sinister, clutching in its talons a Thunderbolt Or.

== Empresses ==
Birth (French) Name	Local name	Noble Title	Subsidiary titles	Coat of Arms	Grand Arms	Portrait	Term begin	Date end	Description
Joséphine
Marie-Josèphe-Rose de Tascher de La Pagerie (Joséphine de Beauharnais)	Joséphine I	Empress of the French	Queen of Italy (26 May 1805 – 10 January 1810), Viscountess of Beauharnais				18 May 1804	16 December 1806	Azure, an Eagle Or, head facing to the sinister, clutching in its talons a Thunderbolt Or.
Marie-Josèphe-Rose de Tascher de La Pagerie (Joséphine de Beauharnais)	Joséphine I	Queen of Italy	Viscountess of Beauharnais	Arms of the Napoleonic Kingdom of Italy		Joséphine Reine d'Italie by Andrea Appiani	17 March 1805	16 December 1809	An escutcheon, with a silver pale charged with the blue Milanic serpent (spitting out the first human for the Duchy of Milan). Both sides of the pale are divided horizontally. The upper right field shows the papal parasol with the keys of Saint Peter. The upper left shows the Venetian lion, but without bible and with a Phrygian cap (revolutionary symbol) on its head (for the Papal States). The lower right quarter shows the white eagle of the house of Este (for the Duchy of Modena) and the lower left shows the arms of Piemonte, but under to the right charged with a silver tower (for Rovigo and Feltre (for the Republic of Venice)). The shield is charged with an escutcheon showing the Iron Crown of Lombardy (with pinnacles (for the Ligurian Republic) in a red border with silver rings.
Marie-Josèphe-Rose de Tascher de La Pagerie (Joséphine de Beauharnais)	Joséphine I	Duchess of Navarre (Note: Though Napoléon and Joséphine had divorced in 1806, Napoléon kept her as an official "member of the senior family". Therefore, her title of Duchess of Navarre is kept here under Empress.)	Duchess of Navarre, Viscountess of Beauharnais		Coat of arms of Josephine de Beauharnais	Empress Joséphine of the French	8 April 1810	29 May 1814†	Quarterly, first: Azure with an imperial eagle Or, encroaching a thunderbolt of the same, second and third: Argent a fess Sable surmounted by three martlets of the same (Armes des Beauharnais) and fourth : Or with three pals Vert.
Marie Louise
Maria Ludovica Leopoldina Franziska Therese Josepha Lucia	Marie Louise I	Empress of the French			Blason de Marie-Louise d'Autriche, Impératrice des Français	Empress Marie Louise of the French	1 April 1810	6 April 1814	Attached from France and Austria, which started from two lines; 1st Or, a lion Gules armed, langued and crowned Azure; second Gules a the fess Argent; third Or, a bend Gules, charged with three alerions Argent. With a mantle of gules, sown with golden bees, fringed with gold, lined with ermines, with an imperial crown surmounted by a globe surmounted by a crisscrossed cross.
Maria Ludovica Leopoldina Franziska Therese Josepha Lucia	Marie Louise I	Queen of Italy		Arms of the Napoleonic Kingdom of Italy		Empress Marie Louise of the French	1 April 1810	6 April 1814	An escutcheon, with a silver pale charged with the blue Milanic serpent (spitting out the first human for the Duchy of Milan). Both sides of the pale are divided horizontally. The upper right field shows the papal parasol with the keys of Saint Peter. The upper left shows the Venetian lion, but without bible and with a Phrygian cap (revolutionary symbol) on its head (for the Papal States). The lower right quarter shows the white eagle of the house of Este (for the Duchy of Modena) and the lower left shows the arms of Piemonte, but under to the right charged with a silver tower (for Rovigo and Feltre (for the Republic of Venice)). The shield is charged with an escutcheon showing the Iron Crown of Lombardy (with pinnacles (for the Ligurian Republic) in a red border with silver rings.

== House of Bonaparte ==
Birth (French) Name	Local name	Noble Title	Relations	Coat of Arms	Grand Arms	Portrait	Term begin	Date end	Description
Joseph Bonaparte
Joseph Bonaparte	Joseph Bonaparte	French Prince	Son of Maria Bonaparte and Brother of Napoléon Bonaparte	Smaller coat of arms of a French Prince during the Napoleonic Wars.	Grand Coat of Arms of a French Prince	Joseph Bonaparte Portrait	1st: 18 May 1804 2: 22 June 1815	1st: 11 April 1814 2: 7 July 1815	Azure with a golden eagle encroaching a thunderbolt of the same.
Joseph Bonaparte	Joseph Bonaparte	Imperial French Prince	Son of Maria Bonaparte and Brother of Napoléon Bonaparte	Smaller coat of arms of a French Prince during the Napoleonic Wars.	Grand Coat of Arms of a French Prince	Joseph Bonaparte Portrait	18 May 1804	20 March 1811	Azure with a golden eagle encroaching a thunderbolt of the same.
Joseph Bonaparte	Giuseppe I	King of Naples (Kingdom of Naples)	Son of Maria Bonaparte and Brother of Napoléon Bonaparte	Beginning of Reign Coat of Arms of Joseph I Bonaparte as King of Naples End of Reign Arms of Joseph Bonaparte as King of Naples	Beginning of Reign Grandes armes de Joseph Bonaparte (Roi de Naples) au début du règne End of Reign Coat of Arms of the Kingdom of Naples	Joseph Bonaparte (by Wicar)	30 March 1806	8 June 1808	BEGINNING OF REIGN: Cut: I, party: a, Azure, with two cornucopias Or passed in saltire (Terra di Lavoro); b, Azure, to a golden dolphin (alias a crowned fish tail) (Otranto); II, of gold, to a triquêtre issante of a head of Mercury of carnation (Island of Sicily); above all azure, with the golden eagle, the head turned, the flight lowered, encroaching a thunderbolt of the same. END OF REIGN: Gironné of 15 pieces: I, in the shape of a quarter-quarter, of gold, with a triquêtre issuant of a head of Mercury of carnation (Island of Sicily); II, of gold to the horse contouné and frightened of sand (of Naples (old)); 3, Azure, 2 horns of plenty Or, set in saltire (Terra di Lavoro); IV, cut in A Azure with a comet Argent hairy Or, in B Argent with a flight Azure; V, Or, to the eagle Gules, crowned with the field, issuant of a fess tilted and lowered Azure (of Basilicata); VI, Argent, to the cross potencée Sable (of Lower Calabria); VII, quartered in saltire Or, with four pals Gules and Argent, with the cross potencée Sable (alias of Aragon and Lower Calabria) (of Upper Calabria); VIII, Or, four pals Gules, a dolphin Argent, plunging towards the end, debruising above all (d'Otranto); IX, quartered in saltire Azure and Argent, with the butt of gold, debruised above all (of Bari); IX, Azure, to a Saint-Michel Or, slaying a devil Sable, on a mountain with three cups of the second, issante of the point (of Capitanate); XI, Gules, to a star with eight spokes of gold, surrounded by a crown of foliage of the same (of Molise); XII, cut Gules, with the antique crown of gold, and of silver. (from Upper-Crown); XIII, Or, to the head Sable, surmounted by a yoke Gules (of Lower Abruzzo); XIV, Azure, to the eagle Argent, surmounting a mountain Or, issante of the point (of the Upper Abruzzo); XV, Gules accompanied by two cross bored the whole Argent; above all azure, with the golden eagle, the head turned, the flight lowered, encroaching a thunderbolt of the same (of Napoleon) in his pavilion of gules.
Joseph Bonaparte	José I	King of Spain and the Indies (Kingdom of Spain)	Son of Maria Bonaparte and Brother of Napoléon Bonaparte	Blason Joseph Ier Bonaparte Roi d'Espagne2	Grand Coat of Arms of Joseph Bonaparte as King of Spain	Joseph-Bonaparte	8 June 1808	11 December 1813	Two contiguous shields: part of one and cut of two: in 1, Gules with the open castle of gold and openwork Azure (Crown of Castile), in 2, Argent with the lion Gules armed, langued and crowned with gold (Kingdom of León), in 3 Or with four pals Gules (Principality of Catalonia), in 4 Gules with gold chains set in orle, cross and saltire, charged in the heart of a natural emerald (Kingdom of Navarre), in 5 Argent with a pomegranate Gules, stalked and foliated Vert and (Kingdom of Granada) 6 Azure, and Gules in the old and new world Or between the columns of Hercules Argent; on the whole of Azure, with the golden eagle, the rounded head, with the lowered flight, encroaching a thunderbolt of the same (House of Bonaparte).
Marie Julie Clary	Giulia I	Queen of Naples (Kingdom of Naples)	Wife of Joseph Bonaparte	Blason Julie Clary2	Grand Coat of Arms of Julie Clary Queen Consort of Naples	Julie Clary	30 March 1806	8 June 1808	Attached to the King of Naples and Clary: Coupé: I, party: a, Azure, with two cornucopias Or passed in saltire (Plowing); b, Azure, to a dolphin circled Argent (alias a crowned fish tail) (Otranto); II, of gold, to a triquêtre issante of a head of Mercury of carnation (Island of Sicily); above all azure, with the golden eagle, the head circled, the flight lowered, encroaching a thunderbolt of the same (from Napoleon to the golden eagle, the head circled, the flight lowered, encroaching a thunderbolt) of the same and that of Clary, Or with an eagle displayed Sable, membered, beaked and tied Gules, a chief Azure charged with a sun Or.
Marie Julie Clary	Julia I	Queen of Spain (Kingdom of Spain)	Wife of Joseph Bonaparte	Blason Julie Clary	Coat of Arms of Julie Clary as Queen Consort of Spain	Julie Clary - enfants	8 June 1808	11 December 1813	Two contiguous shields: part of one and cut of two: in 1, Gules with the open castle of gold and openwork Azure (Crown of Castile), in 2, Argent with the lion Gules armed, langued and crowned with gold (Kingdom of León), in 3 Or with four pals Gules (Principality of Catalonia), in 4 Gules with gold chains set in orle, cross and saltire, charged in the heart of a natural emerald (Kingdom of Navarre), in 5 Argent with a pomegranate Gules, stalked and foliated Vert and (Kingdom of Granada) 6 Azure, and Gules in the old and new world Or between the columns of Hercules Argent; on the whole of Azure, with the golden eagle, the rounded head, with the lowered flight, encroaching a thunderbolt of the same (House of Bonaparte) and that of Clary, Or with the eagle displayed Sable, membered, beaked and bound Gules, a chief Azure charged with a sun Or.
Lucien Bonaparte
Lucien Bonaparte		Prince of Canino	Brother of Napoléon Bonaparte	Blason Lucien Bonaparte	Coat of Arms of Lucien Bonaparte, Roman Prince of Canino	Fabre - Lucien Bonaparte	18 August 1814	29 June 1840	Elliptical shield, Gules with two bars of gold accompanied by two stars of the same, one in chief, the other in point crown of Roman Prince in the antique style, mantle Gules lined with ermine, Legion of honor.
Lucien Bonaparte		French Prince	Brother of Napoléon Bonaparte	Stemma luciano bonaparte	Coat of Arms of Lucien Bonaparte during the Hundred Days2	Robert Lefèvre - Lucien Bonaparte, Prince de Canino (1755-1840)	2 June 1815	1815	On June 2, 1815, peer of France, making Lucien ipso facto a count of the Empire and French prince. (Nevertheless, he remains excluded from the imperial succession because of marriage not authorized by the emperor).
Louis Bonaparte
Louis Bonaparte	Louis Napoléon Bonaparte	French Prince	Brother of Napoléon Bonaparte	Smaller coat of arms of a French Prince during the Napoleonic Wars.	Grand Coat of Arms of a French Prince	Louis Napoléon peint par François Gérard	18 May 1804	1 July 1810	Azure with a golden eagle encroaching a thunderbolt of the same.
Louis Bonaparte	Lodewijk I	King of Holland (Kingdom of Holland)	Brother of Napoléon Bonaparte	Blason du Royaume de Hollande	Coat of Arms of the Kingdom of Holland (1808)	Louis Bonaparte by Vogel von Vogelstein	5 June 1806	1 July 1810	Main article: Coat of arms of the Kingdom of Holland Quarterly: I and IV, Gules, to the lion Or crowned with the same, holding in its dexter paw a bundle of seven arrows Argent, pointed and fletched Or, and in its sinister paw, a sword Argent, garnished with gold (Prince of Orange); II and III, Azure, with the golden eagle, the head rounded, with the lowered flight, encroaching a thunderbolt of the same (of Napoleon).
Napoléon-Louis Bonaparte	Napoléon-Louis Bonaparte	French Prince		Smaller coat of arms of a French Prince during the Napoleonic Wars.	Grand Coat of Arms of a French Prince	Cottrau - Napoléon-Louis Bonaparte (1804-1831)	11 October 1804	1815	Azure with a golden eagle encroaching a thunderbolt of the same.
Napoléon-Louis Bonaparte	Louis I	Grand Duke of Clèves and Berg (Grand Duchy of Berg)	Son of Louis Bonaparte	Coat of arms of Napoleon Bonaparte Louis Grand Duke of Cleves and Berg		Cottrau - Napoléon-Louis Bonaparte (1804-1831)	3 March 1809	1 December 1813	Berg (Duchy of Berg) impaled with Clèves (Duchy of Cleves), overall an inescutcheon of Napoleon.
Napoléon-Louis Bonaparte	Napoléon-Louis Bonaparte	Prince Royal of Holland	Son of Louis Bonaparte			Cottrau - Napoléon-Louis Bonaparte (1804-1831)	5 May 1807	1 July 1810	Main article: Coat of arms of the Kingdom of Holland Quarterly: I and IV, Gules, to the lion Or crowned with the same, holding in its dexter paw a bundle of seven arrows Argent, pointed and fletched Or, and in its sinister paw, a sword Argent, garnished with gold (Prince of Orange); II and III, Azure, with the golden eagle, the head rounded, with the lowered flight, encroaching a thunderbolt of the same (of Napoleon).
Napoléon-Louis Bonaparte	Lodewijk II	King of Holland (Kingdom of Holland)	Son of Louis Bonaparte	Blason du Royaume de Hollande	Coat of Arms of the Kingdom of Holland (1808)	Cottrau - Napoléon-Louis Bonaparte (1804-1831)	1 July 1810	13 July 1810	Main article: Coat of arms of the Kingdom of Holland Quarterly: I and IV, Gules, to the lion Or crowned with the same, holding in its dexter paw a bundle of seven arrows Argent, pointed and fletched Or, and in its sinister paw, a sword Argent, garnished with gold (Prince of Orange); II and III, Azure, with the golden eagle, the head rounded, with the lowered flight, encroaching a thunderbolt of the same (of Napoleon).
Louis-Napoléon Bonaparte	Louis-Napoléon Bonaparte	French Prince	Son of Louis Bonaparte	Smaller coat of arms of a French Prince during the Napoleonic Wars.	Grand Coat of Arms of a French Prince	Hortense with her children	20 April 1808	1815	Azure with a golden eagle encroaching a thunderbolt of the same.
Louis-Napoléon Bonaparte	Louis-Napoléon Bonaparte	Prince Royal of Holland	Son of Louis Bonaparte			Hortense with her children	20 April 1808	13 July 1810	Main article: Coat of arms of the Kingdom of Holland Quarterly: I and IV, Gules, to the lion Or crowned with the same, holding in its dexter paw a bundle of seven arrows Argent, pointed and fletched Or, and in its sinister paw, a sword Argent, garnished with gold (Prince of Orange); II and III, Azure, with the golden eagle, the head rounded, with the lowered flight, encroaching a thunderbolt of the same (of Napoleon).
Jérôme Bonaparte
Jérôme-Napoléon Bonaparte	Jérôme-Napoléon Bonaparte	French Prince	Brother of Napoléon Bonaparte	Smaller coat of arms of a French Prince during the Napoleonic Wars.	Grand Coat of Arms of a French Prince	Rümelin 40 Jérôme Napoléon	18 May 1804	1815	Azure with a golden eagle encroaching a thunderbolt of the same.
Jérôme-Napoléon Bonaparte	Jerome Napoleon I	King of Westphalia (Kingdom of Westphalia)	Brother of Napoléon Bonaparte	Blason Jérôme Bonaparte (1784-1860)2	Grandes Armes Jérôme Bonaparte (1784-1860) 2	King Jerome Bonaparte	9 July 1807	26 October 1813	First quarter shows the silver horse of Westphalia (Electorate of Hanover); the second the lion of Hesse over the counties of Dietz, Nidda, Ziegenhain and Katzenelnbogen (Electorate of Hesse); the third was newly designed for non-specified territories around Magdeburg (Duchy of Magdeburg); and the fourth combined Brunswick, Diepholz, Lüneburg and Lauterburg (Principality of Brunswick-Wolfenbüttel). Around the shield are the Order of the Crown of Westphalia and the French Grand Aigle of the Légion d'honneur. Above is Napoleon's star.
Katharina Friederike von Württemberg	Katharina I	Queen Consort of Westphalia (Kingdom of Westphalia/Kingdom of Württemberg)	Wife of Jérôme Bonaparte	Coat of Arms of Catherine of Württemberg following her marriage to Jérôme-Napoléon Bonaparte. Before her marriage, the left part (that of the King of Westphalia) wasn't part of her coat of arms.	Grandes Armes Catherine de Wurtemberg2	Catharina of Württemberg - Queen of Westphalia	22 August 1807	26 October 1813	First quarter shows the silver horse of Westphalia (Electorate of Hanover); the second the lion of Hesse over the counties of Dietz, Nidda, Ziegenhain and Katzenelnbogen (Electorate of Hesse); the third was newly designed for non-specified territories around Magdeburg (Duchy of Magdeburg); and the fourth combined Brunswick, Diepholz, Lüneburg and Lauterburg (Principality of Brunswick-Wolfenbüttel). Around the shield are the Order of the Crown of Westphalia and the French Grand Aigle of the Légion d'honneur. Above is Napoleon's star. For Kingdom of Württemberg coat of arms: First part of gold, with three half antlers of sable deer, which is for the Duchy of Württemberg, and Second Part of gold with three lions passing sable, for the Duchy of Swabia.

== Grand Dignitaries ==
Initially under the Constitution of the Year XII (1804), six Dignitaries of the Empire (Grandes Dignités de l'Empire) were created:

- Archchancellor of the Empire
- Archchancellor of State of the Empire
- Arch-Treasurer of the Empire
- Grand Elector of the Empire
- Constable of the Empire
- Grand Admiral of the Empire

The following grand dignitaries were later added:

- Vice Grand Elector of the Empire (1807)
- Vice Constable of the Empire (1807)
- Governor General of the Alps Departments (1809)
- Grand Duchess of Tuscany (1809)
- Governor General of the Dutch Departments (1810)

Birth (French) Name	Noble Title	Coat of Arms	Grand Arms	Portrait	Term begin	Date end	Description
Jean-Jacques-Régis de Cambacérès	Archchancellor of the Empire	Armoiries Cambacérès	Blason de la famille de Cambacérès	Jean-Jacques-Regis de Cambaceres (par Henri-Frederic Schopin)	1st: 18 May 1804 2nd: 20 March 1815	1st: 14 April 1814 2nd: 22 June 1815	Or, a dextrochère of carnation, adorned Gules, turned up Ermine, holding the tables of the law Sable, the whole accompanied by three lozenges Sable; a chief Azure sown with bees Or, which is that of the Princes Grand Dignitaries.
Eugène de Beauharnais	Archchancellor of State of the Empire			Gérard - Eugène de Beauharnais 1	18 May 1804	1 February 1805	Azure with a golden eagle encroaching a thunderbolt of the same, the thunderbolt charged with an oval silver medallion overloaded with an E of sand.
Charles-François Lebrun	Arch-Treasurer of the Empire	Blason Charles-François Lebrun (Duc de Plaisance) (Restauration)	Blason Charles-François Lebrun (1739-1824) (Empire)	Charles François Lebrun prince architrésorier de l'Empire	18 May 1804	11 April 1814	Sable, to a wolf stopped Or, supported of the same, surmounted by two billets Argent; a chief cousu Azure sown with stars Or.
Joseph Bonaparte	Grand Elector of the Empire	Smaller coat of arms of a French Prince during the Napoleonic Wars.	Grand Coat of Arms of a French Prince	Joseph Bonaparte Portrait	18 May 1804	30 March 1806	Azure with a golden eagle encroaching a thunderbolt of the same.
Louis Napoléon Bonaparte	Constable of the Empire	Smaller coat of arms of a French Prince during the Napoleonic Wars.	Grand Coat of Arms of a French Prince	Louis Napoléon peint par François Gérard	18 May 1804	5 June 1806	Azure with a golden eagle encroaching a thunderbolt of the same.
Joachim Murat	Grand Admiral of the Empire	Blason de Joachim Murat (1805)		Murat (Gerard)	18 May 1804	8 June 1808	Shield on which is placed a double anchor, surrounded by the collar of the Legion of Honor placed on two Marshal's staff (azure sown with golden eagle), feathered helm, imperial mantle, marquis crown.
Charles-Maurice de Talleyrand-Périgord	Vice Grand Elector of the Empire	Blason Charles-Maurice de Talleyrand-Périgord (1754-1838) (Empire)2		Prud'hon - Portrait de Charles-Maurice de Talleyrand-Périgord (1754-1838), en habit de grand chambellan - P1065 - Musée Carnvalet - 01	14 August 1807	11 April 1814	Party: to the I Gules with three lion cubs Or armed, languid and crowned Azure (Talleyrand-Périgord); in the II of gold with the boar wild boar passing sand loaded on the back of a silver cover (Benevento); to the head of the Sovereign Princes of the Empire debruising the score. Re que Diou: RE QUE DIOU.
Louis-Alexandre Berthier	Vice Constable of the Empire	Coat of Arms of Louis-Alexandre Berthier		Louis-Alexandre Berthier	1807	11 April 1814	Party: to the I, Or, to the dextrochère Argent, armed with Azure heightened Or, holding a sword Sable and charged with a shield Sable to a W surrounded by Commilitoni Victor Caesar, the whole of or, to the head of the Princes Grand Dignitaries of the Empire (Wagram); 2nd, Or, pale Gules, charged with three chevrons Argent (Neufchâtel), a chief of Princes Souverains.
Camillo Filippo Ludovico Borghese	Governor General of the Alps Departments	Blason Camille Borghèse2		Camille Borghèse	24 February 1808	11 April 1814	Party: to the I, Azure, to a winged dragon Or (Borghesi), a chief of the same, charged with an eagle Sable, beaked, membered and crowned Or (Holy Empire); to II, Gules with a parasol with gules and gold braid, topped with a gold cruciferous globe, the spear-shaped stem loaded with two long-salted keys with the bits facing outwards and towards the top, one of gold and the other of silver, bound in gules (gonfalonnier of the Church); to the head of sovereign prince debruising.
Élisa Bonaparte	Grand Duchess of Tuscany	Blason Elisa Bonaparte (1777-1820)	Blason Elisa Bonaparte (1777-1820) orn	Guillaume Guillon-Lethière - Elisa Bonaparte	3 March 1809	1 February 1814	Quarterly: I, Or with six spheres set in orle, five Gules, that in chief Azure charged with three fleur-de-lys Or (from Medici, for Tuscany); II, cut Argent and Gules (from Lucca); III, cut Gules and Or, the chief of the first charged with a two-headed eagle Sable, a crestier Sable with leaves of silver (alias of a branch of thorns Vert in pale) debruising, charged in abyss of 'an escutcheon Gules a bend checkered Argent and Azure, a chief Argent a cross Gules (of Cybo-Malaspina, for Massa and Carrara); IV, Gules with two bands Or accompanied of two mullets of the same; on the whole Azure, with the golden eagle, the circumvented head, with the lowered flight, encroaching a thunderbolt of the same (from Napoleon).

== Marshals of the Empire ==
Birth (French) Name	Noble Title(s)	Noble Title Years (Note: The date is when the title was "confirmed by decree". If another year follows after that, this is when that title was abolished, or the titular holder dropped it, etc.)	Coat of Arms	Grand Arms	Coat of Arms Description	Portrait	Raised to Marshal Date	Notes
Louis-Alexandre Berthier	I: Sovereign Prince of Neuchâtel and Valangin II: Prince of Wagram	I: 25 February 1806 – 3 June 1814 II: 9 July 1809	Coat of Arms (cropped) of Louis Alexandre Berthier	As Prince of Wagram:	Party: to the I, Or, to the dextrochère Argent, armed with Azure heightened Or, holding a sword Sable and charged with a shield Sable to a W surrounded by Commilitoni Victor Caesar, the whole of or, to the head of the fr: Princes Grand Dignitaries of the Empire (Wagram); 2nd, Or, pale Gules, charged with three chevrons Argent (Neuchâtel), a chief of Princes Souverains.	Louis-Alexandre Berthier, Prince de Neufchâtel et de Wagram, maréchal de France (1753-1815)	19 May 1804	1st in seniority for the 1804 First promotion of Marshals.
Joachim Murat	I: Grand Duke of Berg and Clèves II: Lieutenant General of the Realm of the Kingdom of Spain III: King of Naples	I: 15 March 1806 – 1 August 1808 II: 4 May – 20 July 1808 III: 1 August 1808 – 19 May 1815	Coat of Arms as the Grand Duke of Berg & Clèves Blason Joachim Murat Grand-Duc de Clèves et de Berg Coat of Arms as King of Naples: Arms of Joaquim Murat as king of Naples	Coat of Arms as a Marshal and Admiral of the Empire (till 1806): Blason de Joachim Murat (1805) Coat of Arms as the Grand Duke of Berg & Clèves Blason Joachim Murat Grand-Duc de Clèves et de Berg (Orn ext) Coat of Arms as King of Naples: Coat of Arms of the Kingdom of Naples (1808)	As Marshal & Admiral of the Empire: Shield on which is placed a double anchor, surrounded by the collar of the Legion of Honor placed on two Marshal's staff (azure sown with golden eagle), feathered helm, imperial mantle, marquis crown. As Grand Duke of Berg & Clèves: Party: in I of silver with a lion Gules, the forked tail passed in saltire (Duchy of Berg); in II Gules, to the escutcheon Argent, to the spokes of carbuncle Or, brochantes on the whole (Duchy of Cleves); on the whole azure with the golden eagle, the circumvented head, with the lowered flight, encroaching a thunderbolt of the same (from Napoleon), on the insignia of Grand-Admiral of the Empire. As King of Naples: Gironné of 15 pieces: I, in the shape of a quarter-quarter, of gold, with a triquêtre issuant of a head of Mercury of carnation (Island of Sicily); II, of gold to the horse contouné and frightened of sand (of Naples (old)); 3, Azure, 2 horns of plenty Or, set in saltire (Terra di Lavoro); IV, cut in A Azure with a comet Argent hairy Or, in B Argent with a flight Azure; V, Or, to the eagle Gules, crowned with the field, issuant of a fess tilted and lowered Azure (of Basilicata); VI, Argent, to the cross potencée Sable (of Lower Calabria); VII, quartered in saltire Or, with four pals Gules and Argent, with the cross potencée Sable (alias of Aragon and Lower Calabria) (of Upper Calabria); VIII, Or, four pals Gules, a dolphin Argent, plunging towards the end, debruising above all (d'Otranto); IX, quartered in saltire Azure and Argent, with the butt of gold, debruised above all (of Bari); IX, Azure, to a Saint-Michel Or, slaying a devil Sable, on a mountain with three cups of the second, issante of the point (of Capitanate); XI, Gules, to a star with eight spokes of gold, surrounded by a crown of foliage of the same (of Molise); XII, cut Gules, with the antique crown of gold, and of silver. (from Upper-Crown); XIII, Or, to the head Sable, surmounted by a yoke Gules (of Lower Abruzzo); XIV, Azure, to the eagle Argent, surmounting a mountain Or, issante of the point (of the Upper Abruzzo); XV, Gules accompanied by two cross bored the whole Argent; above all azure, with the golden eagle, the head turned, the flight lowered, encroaching a thunderbolt of the same (of Napoleon) in his pavilion of gules.	Murat (Gerard)	19 May 1804	2nd in seniority for the 1804 First promotion of Marshals.
Bon-Adrien Jeannot de Moncey	Duke of Conegliano	July 1808	Blason Adrien Jannot de Moncey (1754-1842)		Azure, a hand Or, winged and maintaining a sword in pale argent.	Marechal Moncey	19 May 1804	3rd in seniority for the 1804 First promotion of Marshals.
Jean-Baptiste Jourdan	Comte de Jourdan		Blason Jean Baptiste Jourdan (1762-1833) (Restauration)	Coat of Arms of Jean-Baptiste, 1st Comte de Jourdan	Azure, with the letters JBJ entwined Or; with a silver border, besantée Sable.	Le maréchal Jourdan	19 May 1804	4th in seniority for the 1804 First promotion of Marshals.
André Masséna	I: Prince of Essling II: Duke of Rivoli	I: 31 January 1810 II: 24 August 1808	Blason André Masséna (1758-1817)	As Prince of Essling: As Duke of Rivoli:	Under the head of the Princes of the Empire: of gold, to a Winged Victory of canarnation, dressed in silver, holding in his dexter hand a palm and in the sinister an olive wreath, the whole of vert, accompanied in tip of a dog lying on the sand.	André Masséna (Fontaine et Gros)	19 May 1804	5th in seniority for the 1804 First promotion of Marshals.
Charles Pierre François Augereau	Duke of Castiglione	19 March 1808	Blason Charles Pierre François Augereau (1757-1816) duc de Castiglione.svg		Azure with a lion Or, quarter of the Barons drawn from the army debruising to the ninth of the shield, and for liveries: blue, red, yellow.	Robert Lefevre 20	19 May 1804	6th in seniority for the 1804 First promotion of Marshals.
Jean Bernadotte	I: Prince of Pontecorvo II: Crown Prince of Sweden	I: 5 June 1806 – 21 August 1810 II: 21 August 1810 – 5 February 1818 (became King of Sweden & Norway)	As Crown Prince of Sweden: Prins Karl (XIV) Johan	As Prince of Pontecorvo: Coat of arms of Jean-Baptiste Bernadotte As Crown Prince of Sweden: Karl XIV Johan Prince de Suède	As Prince of Pontecorvo: Azure, a bridge with three arches Argent, on a river of the same, shaded Azure, and supporting two towers of the second; to the head of the Sovereign Princes of Empire debruising.	Jean-Baptiste-Jules Bernadotte, Prince de Ponte-Corvo, roi de Suède, Maréchal de France (1763-1844)	19 May 1804	7th in seniority for the 1804 First promotion of Marshals. Accepted position of "Crown Prince of Sweden" on 21 August 1810 and dropped all French titles including marshalcy.
Jean-de-Dieu Soult	Duke of Dalmatia	28 June 1808	Blason Nicolas Jean-de-Dieu Soult (1769-1851)		Under the head of the Dukes of the Empire: gold, with the escutcheon Gules, charged with three heads of leopards of the first.	Jean-de-Dieu Soult, maréchal duc de Dalmatie (1769-1851)	19 May 1804	8th in seniority for the 1804 First promotion of Marshals.
Guillaume Marie-Anne Brune	Comte de Brune	2 June 1815				Guillaume Marie-Anne, comte de Brune, maréchal de France (1763-1815)	19 May 1804	9th in seniority for the 1804 First promotion of Marshals.
Jean Lannes	Duke of Montebello	1 June 1808	Blason Jean Lannes (1769-1809)		Under the head of the Dukes of the Empire: Green, with the high sword Or.	Julie Volpelière (d'après Gérard) - Le maréchal Lannes (1769-1809), 1834	19 May 1804	10th in seniority for the 1804 First promotion of Marshals.
Adolphe Édouard Casimir Joseph Mortier	Duke of Trévise	2 July 1808	Blason Adolphe Édouard Casimir Joseph Mortier (1768-1835)		Under the head of the Dukes of the Empire: quartered, I and IV, gold, with the head of a sand horse, that of the I bypassed; II, Azure, to the right hand armed Or, holding a high sword Argent; III, Azure, to the senestrochere armed Or, holding a high sword Argent.	Dubufe - Marshal Mortier	19 May 1804	11th in seniority for the 1804 First promotion of Marshals.
Michel Ney	I: Prince of the Moscow II: Duke of Elchingen	I: 25 March 1813 II: 6 June 1808	Blason Michel Ney (1769-1815)		Under the head of the Dukes of the Empire: Or, with a border Azure, an escutcheon Azure, charged with an orle Or, accosted with two back-to-back hands, dressed in sable, holding silver badelaires.	Marechal Ney	19 May 1804	12th in seniority for the 1804 First promotion of Marshals.
Louis-Nicolas Davout	I: Prince of Eckmühl II: Duke of Auerstedt	I: 15 August 1809 II: 2 July 1808	Blason Louis Nicolas d'Avout (1770-1823)		Under the head of the Dukes of the Empire: Or, 2 lions leopard gules, each holding a Polish lance Sable, one in the first canton, the other, bypassed, in the fourth canton.	Louis nicolas davout	19 May 1804	13th in seniority for the 1804 First promotion of Marshals.
Jean-Baptiste Bessières	Duke of Istria	28 March 1809	Blason Jean Baptiste Bessières (1768-1813)		Under the head of the Dukes of the Empire: quarterly, to the I, Azure, to the lion Or; to II, Argent, to the hawk spinning Sable; 3rd, Or, a tower Azure, open Sable; 4th, Gules, to the fox passing Or.	Reisener - Portrait du maréchal Jean-Baptiste Bessières, duc d'Istries (1768-1813)	19 May 1804	14th in seniority for the 1804 First promotion of Marshals.
François-Étienne-Christophe de Kellermann	Duke of Valmy	May 1808	Blason François Christophe Kellermann (1735-1820)		Under the head of the Dukes of the Empire: cut Gules with an inverted crescent Argent; and Argent, 3 mountains Vert, each surmounted of a star Gules.	Marechal-Kellermann	19 May 1804	15th in seniority for the 1804 First promotion of Marshals. Promoted as an "Honorary Marshal".
François Joseph Lefebvre	Duke of Danzig	10 September 1808	Blason François Joseph Lefebvre (1755-1820)		Party: 1st, Azure, to a right hand, cuirassed Argent, holding a sword of the same, garnished Or; 2nd, Or, a fess Vert, charged with two passers-by, each leading a woman, all Argent, the fess accompanied in chief by a flight Sable, and in base of a cross pattée reamed of the same; to the chief of the dukes of the Empire debruising.	François-Joseph Lefebvre	19 May 1804	16th in seniority for the 1804 First promotion of Marshals. Promoted as an "Honorary Marshal".
Catherine-Dominique de Pérignon	Comte de Pérignon	1808	Blason Catherine-Dominique de Pérignon (1754-1818)		Azure, to a passing ram Argent, accorné Or, the head summoned of a patriarchal cross of the same; in the canton of the Counts Senators debruising.	Dominique-Catherine Pérignon	19 May 1804	17th in seniority for the 1804 First promotion of Marshals. Promoted as an "Honorary Marshal".
Jean-Mathieu-Philibert Sérurier	Comte de Sérurier	8 May 1808	Blason Jean Mathieu Philibert Sérurier (1742-1819)		Gules, to the seated greyhound Argent; in the canton of the Counts Senators debruising.	Jean mathieu philibert serurier	19 May 1804	18th in seniority for the 1804 First promotion of Marshals. Promoted as an "Honorary Marshal".
Claude Victor-Perrin	Duke of Belluno	10 September 1808	Blason Claude-Victor Perrin (1764-1841)		Under the head of the Dukes of the Empire: party, to the I of azure to the dextrochère argent garnished with moving gold of the partition: in II Or with a lion sable, a fess gules debruised.	Claude-Victor Perrin	12 July 1807	Made a Marshal of the Empire in 1807 following his exemplary conduct at the Battle of Friedland.
Étienne Jacques-Joseph-Alexandre Macdonald	Duke of Taranto	9 December 1809	Blason Étienne Jacques Joseph Macdonald (1765-1840) Duc de Tarente		Quarterly: 1st, Argent, to the lion Gules; 2nd, Or, a dextrochère, armed Gules, holding a cross crisscross at the stuck foot of the same; 3rd, Or, to a galley Sable, flagged and weather-vane Gules; 4th, Green; to the silver salmon; all below the head of the Duke of the Empire debruised.	MacDonald par Antoine Jean Gros	12 July 1809	Made a Marshal of the Empire in 1809 following his conduct at the Battle of Wagram, and only Marshal ever appointed on a battlefield. Napoléon decreed he was the choice "for France".
Nicolas Charles Oudinot	I: Duke of Reggio II: Comte de Oudinot	I: 14 April 1810 II: 19 March / 2 July 1808	Blason Nicolas Charles Marie Oudinot (1767-1847) Duc de Reggio		Party: I, Gules, 3 helmets Argent; II, Argent, to the lion Gules, holding a grenade Sable inflamed Gules; all below the head of the Duke of the Empire debruised.	Nicolas Charles Oudinot by Robert Lefèvre	12 July 1809	Made a Marshal of the Empire in 1809 following his conduct at the Battle of Wagram. Napoléon decreed he was the choice "for the Army".
Auguste Frédéric Louis Viesse de Marmont	Duke of Ragusa	28 June 1808	Blason Auguste Frédéric Louis Viesse de Marmont (1774-1852)		Quarterly: I and IV, Argent, 3 bends Gules; II, Or, to the standard Gules, to the cross Argent, set in bend, the trable Sable; III, party: a, Azure, to the Cross of Lorraine Or; Gules, to a flaming sword in pale Argent; all below the head of the Duke of the Empire debruised.	Marmont	12 July 1809	Made a Marshal of the Empire in 1809 following his conduct at the Battle of Wagram. Napoléon decreed he was the choice "for Friendship".
Louis-Gabriel Suchet	I: Duke of Albufera II: Comte de Suchet	I: 11 January 1813 II: 19 March / 24 June 1808	Blason Famille Suchet Albufera		Under the head of the Dukes of the Empire, party 3, cut into: 1. Or, 4 vergettes Gules, three irons of Pikes Argent, debruising above all 2. Argent, to the tower Sable, surmounted by three turrets of the same 3. Quarterly Gules in turn Sable, and Or to the green tree 4. Argent, 3 wavy pals of azure 5. Azure, to a galley, surmounted by "SAG" and accompanied by a point of a dolphin and a shall, all Argent; 6. Or, 4 vergettes Gules, at the foot of lily Argent debruising above all 7. Azure, a tower Sable, surmounted by three turrets and terraced green 8. Or, 5 mullets Azure set in saltire; all superimposed upon: I: Party of military counts of the Empire and gold, in the half-flight reversed Sable; II: Gules, to the lion leopard Argent, passing over a bridge of wood Or, and holding an olive branch of the same	Gault - Le maréchal Suchet, duc d'Albufera (1770-1826)	8 July 1811	Made a Marshal of the Empire for his exemplary and conduct throughout the Peninsular War, and only marshal to gain his baton during said campaign. Awarded following the Siege of Tarragona.
Laurent de Gouvion Saint-Cyr	Comte de Gouvion-Saint-Cyr	May 1808	Blason Laurent Gouvion-Saint-Cyr (1764-1830)		Cut, at I, left of the district of the Military Counts of the Empire surrounded by a chain of silver and azure with a gold star; at II, sand	Laurent de Gouvion-Saint-Cyr	27 August 1812	Made a Marshal of the Empire for his brilliant defence and later tactical withdrawal which held off a Russian counter-attack at Polotsk twice. Granted his baton after the first battle.
Prince Józef Antoni Poniatowski	No titles for the French Empire.		Ciolek	Józef ks Poniatowski CoA	Argent, with an ox Gules, on a green terrace.	Prince Jozef Poniatowski, by Josef Grassi	17 October 1813	Only foreigner to become a Marshal of France under Napoleon, awarded for his bravery during the Invasion of Russia.
Emmanuel de Grouchy	Comte de Grouchy	28 January 1809	Blason Emmanuel de Grouchy (1766-1847)		Or, fretté Azure; over-all Argent, 3 trefoils Vert; in the canton of the Military Counts of the Empire debruising	Emmanuel de Grouchy 2	17 April 1815	Initially a brave cavalry commander, but later blamed for Napoléon's defeat during the Hundred Days. Made a Marshal of the Empire on the advice of Marshal Louis-Nicolas Davout (Minister of War at this time). Last Marshal created by Napoléon.

== Commune Amorial ==
During the Napoleonic Wars, several regions were integrated into 'Metropolitan France', becoming départements. These are listed separately.
