= Proof by assertion =

Informal fallacy

Proof by assertion, sometimes informally referred to as proof by repeated assertion, is an informal fallacy in which a proposition is repeatedly restated regardless of contradiction and refutation. The proposition can sometimes be repeated until any challenges or opposition cease, letting the proponent assert it as fact, and solely due to a lack of challengers (argumentum ad nauseam). In other cases, its repetition may be cited as evidence of its truth, in a variant of the appeal to authority or appeal to belief fallacies.

Proof by assertion can also occur when the evidence cited is actually no different from the assertion itself. An argument that actually contains premises that are all the same as the assertion is thus proof by assertion.

This fallacy is sometimes used as a form of rhetoric by politicians, or during a debate as a filibuster. In its extreme form, it can also be a form of brainwashing. Modern politics contains many examples of proofs by assertion. This practice can be observed in the use of political slogans, and the distribution of "talking points", which are collections of short phrases that are issued to members of modern political parties for recitation, and in order to achieve maximum message repetition. The technique is also sometimes used in advertising.

== See also ==
- Argumentum ad lapidem
- Big lie
- Circular reasoning
- Dead cat strategy
- Denialism
- Ipse dixit
- On Bullshit
- Talking point
- Woozle effect
- Carthago delenda est
