= Royal Air Forces Escaping Society =

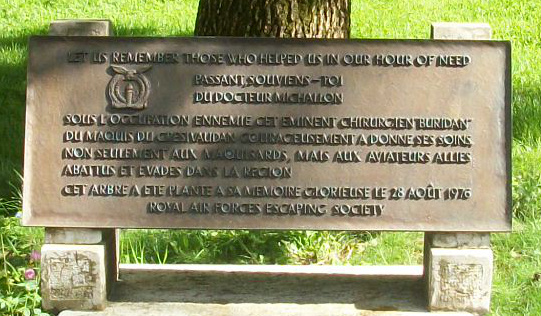
RAFES memorial in Grenoble, France.

The Royal Air Forces Escaping Society, was a UK-based charitable organization formed in 1946 to provide help to those in the former occupied countries in World War II who put their lives at risk to assist and save members of the "Royal Air Forces" (that is, Air Forces of the British Commonwealth) who were attempting to escape and evade capture.

The society was based at the Duke of York's Headquarters, London and had the Latin motto Solvitur ambulando (solved by walking). It helped the widows, dependents and orphans of those who died and those requiring medical treatment or otherwise in need. It also fostered continued friendship between escapers and evaders and their helpers. Air Chief Marshal Sir Basil Embry was the president of the RAFES from its formation until the 1970s.

The society was disbanded with the laying up of its UK standard in Lincoln Cathedral on 17 September 1995 and the last president was Air Chief Marshal Sir Lewis Hodges. There remains a small Royal Air Forces Escaping Society Museum at the Lincolnshire Aviation Heritage Centre in East Kirkby, near Spilsby, Lincolnshire and commemorative plaques sponsored by the RAFES at several locations including; the Royal Air Force Museum London, St Clement Danes Church and the Musée de l'Armée at the Hôtel des Invalides, Paris.

== See also ==
- Royal Air Force Association
- The Royal British Legion
- SSAFA Forces Help
- RAF Benevolent Fund
