= Coat of arms of the Kingdom of Holland =

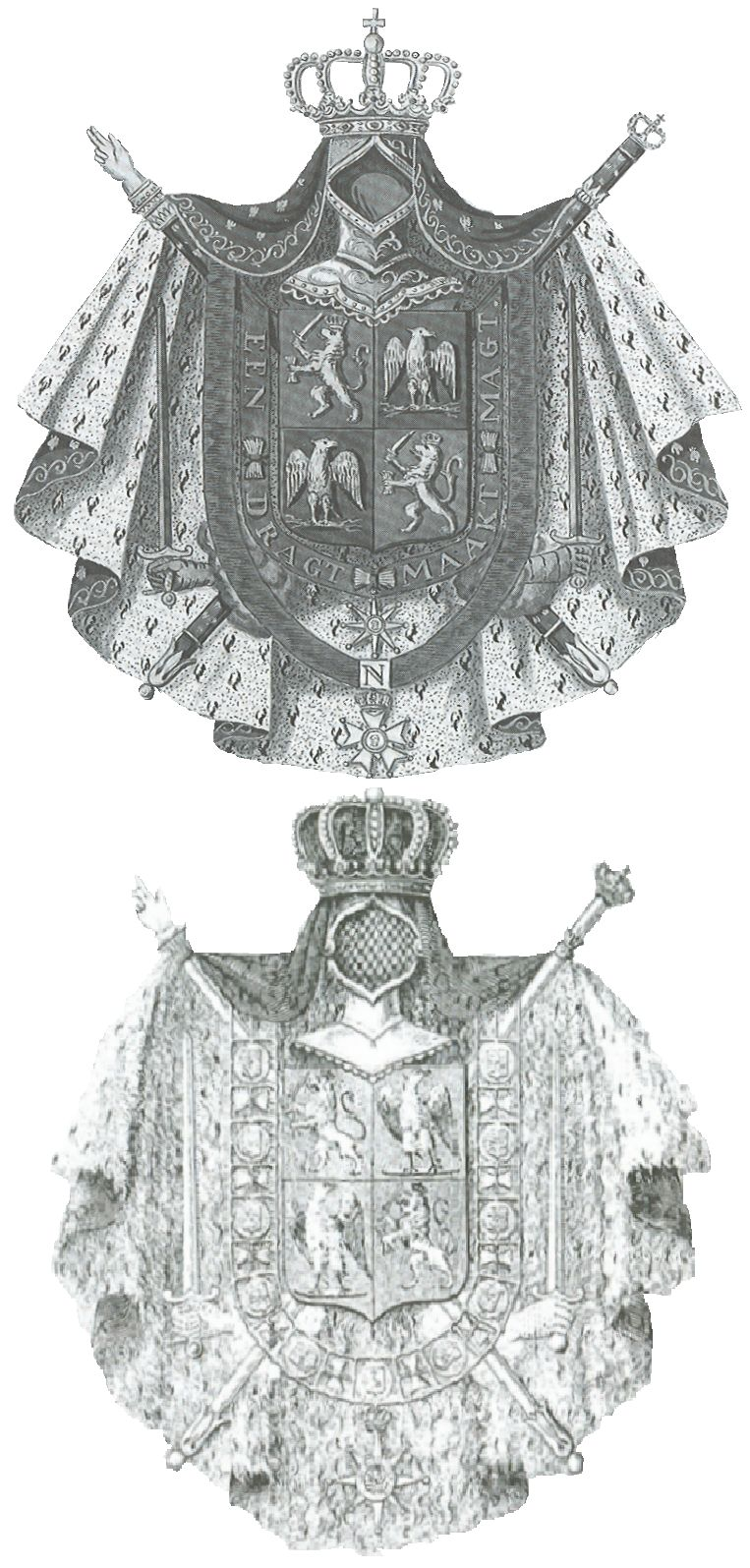
The royal arms

The coat of arms of the Kingdom of Holland, a client state of Napoleon Bonaparte's French Empire which encompassed most of the modern-day state of the Netherlands, was instituted in 1806.

When the Emperor Napoleon proposed that his younger brother Louis Napoleon Bonaparte should become the king of a new kingdom, a state that would replace and succeed the age-old Dutch republic, at that time called the "Batavian Republic". He chose the name "Holland", after the most important province, as "Hollande" was much used in France as a name for the Netherlands.

The statute described the royal arms and mentioned a royal crown. On 20 May 1807 a precise drawing of the royal coat of arms was approved by the king. The crown was topped with an orb with a cross.

In practice crowns without a cross became part of the crosses of Louis' Order of Knighthood, the Order of the Union, and the new coins. The second coat of arms, approved on 6 February 1806, showed no cross.

The royal arms

As the country was ruined by the Napoleonic Wars and the resulting lack of trade there was no opportunity for a coronation. The crown existed on paper alone until the French annexed the country in 1810. In 1813 the Dutch chose a new sovereign ruler, later king, William I who had a new crown, the crown of the Netherlands designed and wrought in gilded silver.

== See also ==
- Circlet
- Coronet
- Diadem
- Helmet
- Tiara
- Papal tiara
- Crown jewels
- List of royal crowns
