= Veillons au salut de l'Empire =

Unofficial Napoleonic French anthem

English: Let's ensure the salvation of the Empire
- Unofficial national anthem of France
- Lyrics: Adrien-Simon Boy, 1791
- Music: Nicolas Dalayrac, 1787
- Succeeded by: Le Retour des Princes français à Paris

Audio sample
- Veillons au salut de l'Empire: file; help

Veillons au salut de l'Empire (transl. Let's ensure the salvation of the Empire) was the unofficial French national anthem under Napoleon.

== History ==
The lyrics were written in the later months of 1791 by Adrien-Simon Boy, who was the chief surgeon of the Army of the Rhine. Boy would only have written the first three verses, as the fourth would be added in 1810 by an unknown author.

The song's melody was from Vous qui d’amoureuse aventure, courez et plaisirs et dangers of the comedic opera Renaud d'Ast (1787) by Nicolas Dalayrac.

== Lyrics ==
Veillons au salut de l'Empire
| French lyrics | English translation |
| Veillons au salut de l'empire, | Let's ensure the salvation of the Empire, |
| Veillons au maintien de nos lois; | Let's ensure the maintenance of our laws; |
| Si le despotisme conspire, | If despotism conspires, |
| Conspirons la perte des rois! | We conspire the downfall of kings! |
| Liberté! Liberté! que tout mortel te rende hommage! | Liberty! Liberty! may every mortal pay you homage! |
| Tyrans, tremblez! vous allez expier vos forfaits! | Tyrants, tremble! You will atone for your crimes! |
| Plutôt la mort que l'esclavage! | Death rather than slavery! |
| C'est la devise des Français. | That's the motto of the French. |
| Du salut de notre patrie | On our homeland's sake |
| Dépend celui de l'univers. | Depends the whole universe. |
| Si jamais elle est asservie, | If ever it were subjugated, |
| Tous les peuples sont dans les fers. | All people would be in chains. |
| Liberté! que tout mortel te rende hommage! | Freedom! (repeat) may every mortal pay you homage! |
| Tyrans, tremblez! vous allez expier vos forfaits! | Tyrants, tremble! You will atone for your crimes! |
| Plutôt la mort que l'esclavage! | Death rather than slavery! |
| C'est la devise des Français. | That's the motto of the French. |
| Ennemis de la tyrannie, | Enemies of tyranny, |
| Paraissez tous, armez vos bras. | Appear and arm yourselves. |
| Du fond de l'Europe avilie, | From the heart of disgraced Europe, |
| Marchez avec nous aux combats. | March with us to the battles. |
| Liberté ! (bis) que ce nom sacré nous rallie. | Freedom! (repeat) May this sacred word rally us. |
| Poursuivons les tyrans, punissons leurs forfaits ! | Let's chase the tyrants and punish their crimes! |
| Nous servons la même patrie : | We serve the same homeland: |
| Les hommes libres sont Français. | Free men are Frenchmen. |
| Jurons union éternelle | We swear to an eternal union |
| Avec tous les peuples divers; | With all the diverse peoples; |
| Jurons une guerre mortelle | We swear to a deadly war |
| À tous les rois de l'univers. | Upon all the kings of the universe. |
| Liberté ! (bis) que ce nom sacré nous rallie ! | Freedom! (repeat) May this sacred word rally us. |
| Poursuivons les tyrans; punissons leurs forfaits! | Let's chase the tyrants and punish their crimes! |
| On ne voit plus qu'une patrie | One doesn't see anything more than a homeland |
| Quand on a l'âme d'un Français. | When he has the soul of a Frenchman. |
