= Solvitur ambulando =

Latin phrase meaning "it is solved by walking"

Solvitur ambulando (Latin: [ˈsolwitur ambuˈlandoː]) is a Latin phrase which means "it is solved by walking", referring to an anecdotal, practical solution to a seemingly complex philosophical problem. It is often attributed to Saint Augustine in a refutation of Zeno's paradoxes of motion.

== Philosophy ==
Zeno's paradoxes state that if one were to examine individual moments of an object moving in a given direction, (as with an arrow flying towards a target) or overtaking a second, slower object, (as with Achilles challenging a tortoise to a race) one would not actually be able to find a moment of the act of change or motion taking place, thus proving Zeno's view of motion as illusory and impossible. The literal solvitur ambulando originates with Diogenes the Cynic in an account by Simplicius of Cilicia of a debate against Zeno; upon hearing his opponent's argument, Diogenes silently rose and walked away, thus implying the reality of motion to be so self-evident that any attempt to debate it is meaningless.

The debate is retold by Pushkin in his eight line poem "Motion" (1825), with further reference to the apparent motion of the sun in a seeming contrast to Galileo's heliocentric system.

The phrase appears early in Lewis Carroll's "What the Tortoise Said to Achilles", where Achilles uses it to accentuate that he was indeed successful in overtaking Tortoise in their race to empirically test one of Zeno's paradoxes. This passage also appears in Douglas Hofstadter's book Gödel, Escher, Bach (1979).

Later assertions of a superficially obvious reality in the face of abstract philosophical quandaries include Dr Samuel Johnson's appeal to the stone and Ludwig Wittgenstein's "hinge" epistemology.

== Other uses ==
In Dorothy L. Sayers's Clouds of Witness (1926), during the Duke of Denver's trial before the House of Lords, the Lord High Steward suggests (to laughter) Solvitur ambulando to determine whether the decedent crawled or was dragged to a different location, as this was a matter of dispute between the prosecution and the defense.

The phrase is also cited in The Songlines (1986) by Bruce Chatwin in its literal meaning. Chatwin, who "passionately believed that walking constituted the sovereign remedy for every mental travail", learned it from Patrick Leigh Fermor and immediately wrote it down in his notebook. In this sense the phrase can be used as a truism for the wider physical and mental benefits of walking and other forms of regular exercise.

The phrase is discussed multiple times and at some length in The Tao of Travel (2011) by Paul Theroux. It also appears in the writings of Aleister Crowley, and Oliver Sacks. It is the motto of the Royal Air Forces Escaping Society.

== See also ==
- "Behold, a man!"
- "How many angels can dance on the head of a pin?"
- Management by walking around
- Kisa Gotami
