= Ad nauseam =

Discussion that has continued to the point of nausea

ad nauseam
- Origin: Latin
- Meaning: "to the point of nausea"

Ad nauseam is a Latin term used to describe an argument or a discussion that has been extended to the figurative point of nausea. For example, "this has been discussed ad nauseam" indicates that the topic has been discussed extensively and those involved have grown sick of it.

The fallacy of dragging the conversation to an ad nauseam state in order to then assert one's position as correct due to it not having been contradicted is also called argumentum ad infinitum (to infinity) and argument from repetition.

The term is defined by the American Heritage Dictionary as "to a disgusting or ridiculous degree; to the point of nausea". Colloquially, it is sometimes used as "until nobody cares to discuss it any more".

== Origin ==
ad nauseam originates as a Latin expression, translating to "to nausea". It combines the preposition ad ("to") with nauseam the accusative case of nausea ("nausea" or "seasickness"). This term nausea traces back to Ancient Greek nausía, denoting "seasickness" and stemming from naûs ("ship"). In English, the phrase appeared during the mid 16th century. The earliest documented instance occurs in a 1565 translation by John Hall, where it describes continuation to the point of inducing disgust. By 1644, usage had become more established, often meaning excessive repetition that leads to weariness. During the 17th century, the expression got higher usage in English literature and discourse, particularly for critiquing repetitive debates or ideas.

== See also ==
- Ad libitum
- Big lie
- Carthago delenda est
- Filibuster
- Godwin's law
- List of Latin phrases
- Proof by assertion
- Rumination (psychology)
- Sealioning
- Sisyphus
- Thought-terminating cliché
