= Carthago delenda est =

Latin oratorical phrase

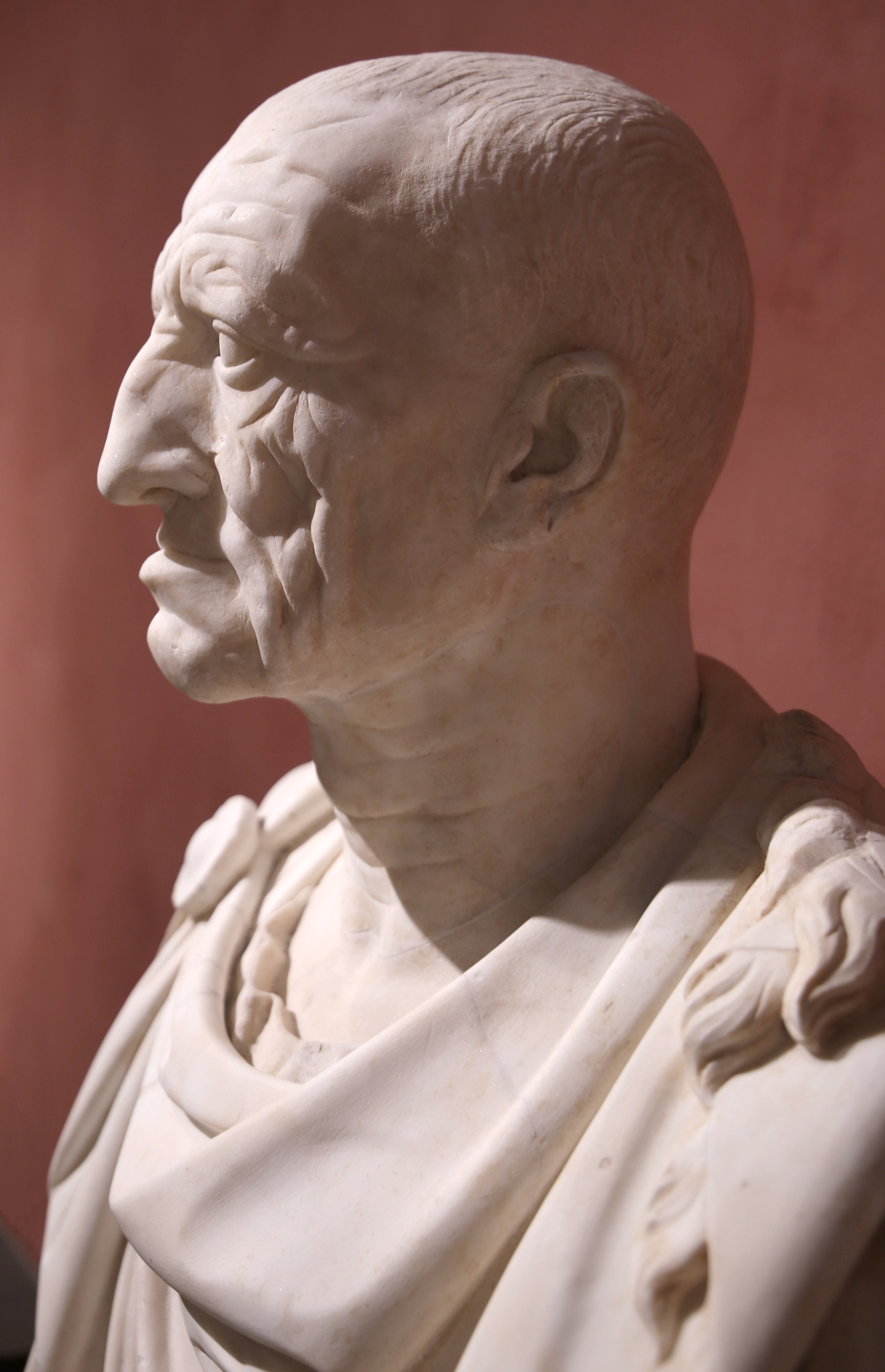
Cato the Elder (234–149 BC), the most persistent advocate in the Senate for the total destruction of Carthage, was associated with repeated use, in or out of its proper context, of the phrase Delenda est Carthago.

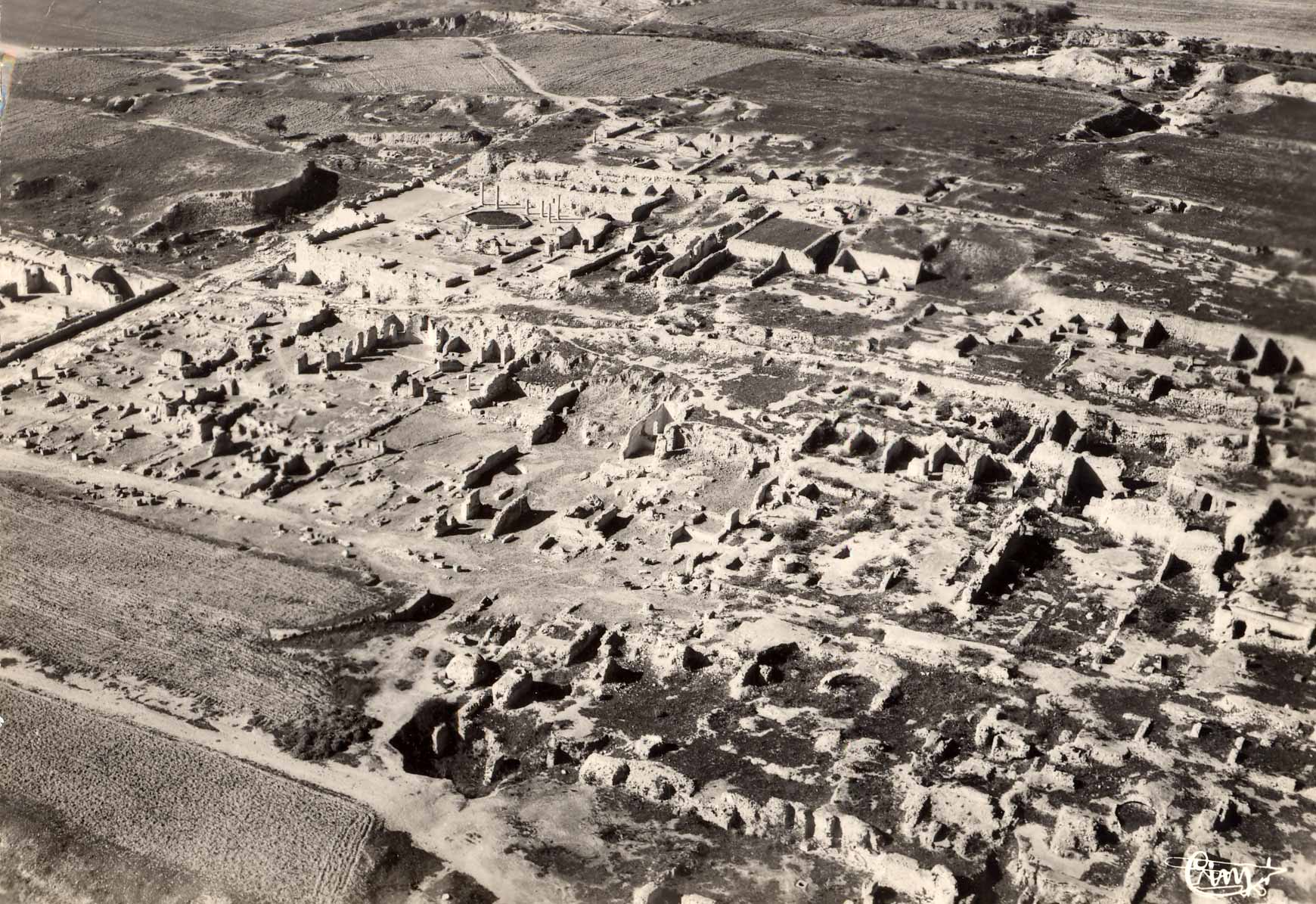
Ruins in Carthage

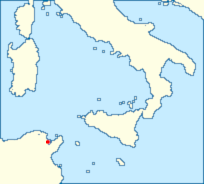
The location of Carthage in North Africa

Ceterum (autem) censeo Carthaginem esse delendam ("Furthermore, I think that Carthage must be destroyed"), often abbreviated to Carthago delenda est or delenda est Carthago ("Carthage must be destroyed"), is a Latin oratorical phrase attributed to Cato the Elder, a politician of the Roman Republic. The phrase originates from debates held in the Roman Senate prior to the Third Punic War (149–146 BC) between Rome and Carthage. Cato is said to have used the phrase as the conclusion to all of his speeches to push for the war, even when the speech was otherwise unrelated to Carthage or foreign affairs.

== Historical background ==
Although Rome was successful in the first two Punic Wars, as it vied for dominance with the seafaring Punic city-state of Carthage in North Africa (now Tunisia), it suffered several humiliations and damaging reverses in the course of these engagements, especially at the Battle of Cannae in 216 BC. Rome nonetheless managed to win the Second Punic War thanks to Scipio Africanus in 201 BC. After its defeat, Carthage ceased to be a threat to Rome and was reduced to a small territory that was equivalent to what is now northeastern Tunisia.

However, Cato the Censor visited Carthage in 152 BC as a member of a senatorial embassy, which was sent to arbitrate a conflict between the Punic city and Massinissa, the king of Numidia and ally of Rome at the end of the Second Punic War. Cato, a veteran of the Second Punic War, was shocked by Carthage's wealth, which he considered dangerous for Rome. He then relentlessly called for its destruction and ended all of his speeches with the phrase, even when the debate was on a completely different matter. The Senate did not follow him, especially due to Publius Cornelius Scipio Nasica Corculum, the son-in-law of Scipio Africanus and the most influential senator, being opposed to the war; Corculum argued that the fear of a common enemy was necessary to maintain Roman unity and keep the people in check. Like Cato, he ended all his speeches with the same phrase, saying "Carthage must be saved" (Carthago servanda est).

Cato finally won the debate after Carthage had attacked Massinissa, which gave a casus belli to Rome since the peace treaty of 201 BC prevented Carthage from declaring war without Rome's assent. In 146 BC, Carthage was razed by Scipio Aemilianus—Africanus's grandson—and its entire remaining population was sold into slavery, and Africa then became a Roman province. The notion that Roman forces then sowed the city with salt is a 19th-century invention.

== Historical literary sources ==
No ancient source gives the phrase exactly as it is usually quoted in modern times. Its current form was made by English and French scholars at the turn of the 18th and 19th centuries, while German scholars have used the longer "Ceterum censeo Carthaginem delendam esse". Ancient authors quote the phrase as follows:

- Pliny the Elder, in his Natural History: "[Cato], cum clamaret omni senatu Carthaginem delendam, …"
- Aurelius Victor in his De viris illustribus: "[Marcus Porcius Cato] Carthaginem delendam censuit."
- Florus, in his Epitome of Livy: "Cato inexpiabili odio delendam esse Carthaginem … pronuntiabat."

Therefore, Pliny the Elder, Florus and the Pseudo Aurelius Victor quote the phrase Carthago delenda est in indirect speech.

Instead, only a paraphrastic translation is the Greek rendering of the Catonian phrase by Plutarch in his Life of Cato the Elder, 27: "Δοκεῖ δέ μοι καὶ Καρχηδόνα μὴ εἶναι" ("Videtur et hoc mihi, Carthaginem non debere esse", 'It seems best to me that Carthage no longer exist').

== Modern usage ==
The phrase is sometimes fully adopted in modern usage and sometimes paraphrased, as a learned reference to the concept of total warfare. In 1673, the English minister Anthony Ashley Cooper, 1st Earl of Shaftesbury revived the phrase in the form "Delenda est Carthago" in a speech before Parliament during the Third Anglo-Dutch War, comparing England to Rome and the Dutch Republic to Carthage. In the 1890s, the London newspaper Saturday Review published several articles that expressed an anti-German sentiment, summed up in the quote Germania est delenda ('Germany must be destroyed'). In 1899, the Russian writer Leo Tolstoy retained the phrase's form "Carthago delenda est" for the title of a pacifist essay condemning war and militarism published in the liberal London newspaper The Westminster Gazette. Jean Hérold-Paquis, a broadcaster on the German-controlled Radio Paris in occupied France between 1940 and 1944 had "England, like Carthage, shall be destroyed!" as his catchphrase.

The phrase was used as the title for Alan Wilkins's 2007 play on the Third Punic War, and for a 2010 book about Carthaginian history by Richard Miles.

In a modern meaning, the syntagma "ceterum censeo" used by itself refers to an oft reiterated statement, usually a core belief of the one issuing it.

Steve Bannon often paraphrased Cato the elder by saying "CCP delende est", referring to the Chinese Communist Party.

Janusz Korwin-Mikke, a Polish eurosceptic member of the eighth European Parliament (2014–2018), often paraphrased Cato the elder. At the end of his speeches, Mikke would often conclude with the words: "And besides, I believe that the European Union should be destroyed." (A poza tym sądzę, że Unia Europejska powinna zostać zniszczona")

Former Dutch politician Marianne Thieme, once lead candidate for the Party for the Animals, always concluded her speeches in Parliament with the phrase: "Furthermore we are of the opinion that factory farming has to be ended." ("Voorts zijn wij van mening dat er een einde moet komen aan de bio-industrie")

Delenda est Monarchia ("monarchy must be destroyed") was coined by the Spanish philosopher José Ortega y Gasset in his 1930 op-ed "El error Berenguer".

During the Russian invasion of Ukraine (2022-present), Latvian president, Edgars Rinkēvičs, tweeted twice "Ruzzia delenda est" ("Russia delenda est") in 2023 and 2024.

== Grammatical analysis ==
The phrase employs delenda, the feminine singular gerundive form of the verb dēlēre ("to destroy"). The gerundive (or future passive participle) delenda is a verbal adjective that may be translated as "to be destroyed". When combined with a form of the verb esse ("to be"), it adds an element of compulsion or necessity, yielding "is to be destroyed", or, as it is more commonly rendered, "must be destroyed". The gerundive delenda functions as a predicative adjective in this construction, which is known as the passive periphrastic.

The short form of the phrase, Carthago delenda est, is an independent clause. Consequently, the feminine singular subject noun Carthago appears in the nominative case. The verb est (Note: Est is the third-person singular present active indicative form of the verb esse; here, the person (third) and number (singular) of the verb are controlled by the subject noun, Carthago.) functions as a copula—linking the subject noun Carthago to the predicative verbal adjective delenda—and further imparts a deontic modality to the clause as a whole. (Note: To be clear, the semantic import of "Carthage is to be destroyed" is not "Carthage is scheduled for future destruction," but rather that "Carthage must be destroyed." The former is a flaccid recital of a future eventuality; the latter is a normative statement of what needs to happen, of moral desert. That is the deontic modality. See, e.g., Risselada, Rodie. Imperatives and Other Directive Expressions in Latin: A Study in the Pragmatics of a Dead Language. Brill Academic Publishers, 1993. p. 179. Print. (noting that the periphrastic gerundival construction "has a general deontic value.")) Because delenda is a predicative adjective in relation to the subject noun Carthago, it takes the same number (singular), gender (feminine) and case (nominative) as Carthago.

The fuller forms Ceterum censeo delendam esse Carthaginem and Ceterum autem censeo delendam esse Carthaginem use the so-called accusative and infinitive construction for the indirect statement. In each of these forms, the verb censeo ("I opine") sets up the indirect statement delendam esse Carthaginem ("[that] Carthage is to be destroyed"). Carthaginem, the subject of the indirect statement, is in the accusative case; while the verb esse is in its present infinitive form. Delendam is a predicate adjective in relation to the subject noun Carthaginem and thus takes the same number (singular); gender (feminine); and case (accusative) as Carthaginem.

== See also ==
- Ad nauseam
- Amalek
- Carthaginian peace
- Death to America
- Death to Israel
- Debellatio
- Genocide
- No quarter
- Proof by assertion
- List of Latin phrases

== Bibliography ==
=== Ancient sources ===
- Florus, Epitome.
- Gaius Plinius Secundus (Pliny the Elder), Naturalis historia ("Natural History").
- Plutarch, Parallel Lives
- Diodorus Siculus, Bibliotheca historica ("Historical Library").
- Aurelius Victor, De viris illustribus Romae.

=== Modern sources ===
- F. E. Adcock, "'Delenda est Carthago'", in The Cambridge Historical Journal, Vol. 8, No. 3 (1946), pp. 117–128.
- Alan E. Astin, Cato the Censor, Oxford University Press, 1978.
- John F. Miller & A. F. Woodman (editors), Latin Historiography and Poetry in the Early Empire, Leiden/Boston, Brill, 2010.
- O'Gorman, Ellen (Spring–Fall 2004). "Cato the elder and the destruction of Carthage". Helios. 31: 96–123. Archived from the original on 28 April 2019 – via Questia.
- Little, Charles E. “The Authenticity and Form of Cato’s Saying ‘Carthago Delenda Est.’” The Classical Journal, vol. 29, no. 6 (1934), pp. 429–35.
- Purcell, Nicholas (1995). "On the Sacking of Carthage and Corinth". In Innes, Doreen; Hine, Harry; Pelling, Christopher (eds.). Ethics and Rhetoric: Classical Essays for Donald Russell on his Seventy Fifth Birthday. Oxford: Clarendon. pp. 133–148. ISBN 978-0-19-814962-0.
- Ridley, Ronald (1986). "To Be Taken with a Pinch of Salt: The Destruction of Carthage". Classical Philology. 81 (2): 140–146. doi:10.1086/366973. JSTOR 269786. S2CID 161696751.
- Ripley, George; Dana, Charles A. (1858–1863). "Carthage". The New American Cyclopædia: a Popular Dictionary of General Knowledge. Vol. 4. New York: D. Appleton. p. 497. OCLC 1173144180.
- Silvia Clavadetscher-Thürlemann, "Ceterum censeo Carthaginem esse delendam", Gymnasium 81 (1974), pp. 465–476.
- Ursula Vogel-Weidemann, "Carthago delenda est: Aita and Prophasis", in Acta Classica XXXII (1989), pp. 79–95.
- Gordon, Gregory S. (2017). Atrocity Speech Law: Foundation, Fragmentation, Fruition. Oxford University Press. ISBN 978-0-19-061270-2.
