= Aitia (company) =

American biotechnology company

- Formerly: Gene Network Sciences (2000-2010); GNS Healthcare (2010-2023)
- Type: Private (subsidiary of Via Science)
- Founded: Ithaca, New York, USA (2000)
- Founder: Colin Hill (CEO); Iya Khalil
- Headquarters: Cambridge, Massachusetts, USA
- Website: https://www.aitiabio.com/

Aitia, formerly known as GNS Healthcare, is an American biotechnology company based in Cambridge, Massachusetts. The company was founded in 2000 in Ithaca, New York as Gene Network Sciences by Colin Hill and Iya Khalil, who studied physics at Cornell University. Its early work involved computational biology models of gene and protein interactions aimed at cancer drug discovery. It began doing business as GNS Healthcare in 2010, extending its analytics to the healthcare provider, health insurance and health informatics sectors. In January 2023 it rebranded as Aitia to focus primarily on drug target discovery and development.

== History ==
The company was founded in 2000 as Gene Network Sciences (GNS) by Colin Hill and Iya Khalil, who studied physics at Cornell University. Its early work focused on computational biology models of interactions among genes and proteins in cells, with a focus on cancer drug discovery.

Over its first six years, the company received several federal grants totalling ~$10 million, including from the US Dept of Energy’s Genomes to Life Program for bioremediation, the National Institute of Standards and Technology (NIST), and the National Institutes of Health (NIH), focused largely on cancer discovery. In 2004, Hill was named to MIT Technology Review's TR100 list of innovators under the age of 35.

In 2010, the company began doing business as GNS Healthcare, to reflect the expansion of its AI tools into the healthcare provider, health insurance, pharmacy benefit management and health informatics sectors. During this period, it undertook analytics collaborations with healthcare organizations such as Aetna.

In 2017, the company announced an oncology collaboration with Genentech to apply its REFS platform to cancer drug development. In 2019, it raised $23 million in a financing round led by Cigna Ventures, with participation from Amgen Ventures, Celgene, Echo Health Ventures and Alexandria Venture Investments. A series D financing round from Cigna, Cambia, Celgene, Amgen, and Merck was completed in 2019.

In June 2020, GNS Healthcare and the Multiple Myeloma Research Foundation (MMRF) announced a five-year collaboration to apply the company's REFS platform to the MMRF's CoMMpass study, a multiple myeloma patient registry, to model disease progression and drug response.

In January 2023, GNS Healthcare announced that it would rebrand as Aitia, a name derived from the Greek word for causality, to reflect its shift from providing analytics technology as a service to pharmaceutical companies toward collaborative causal AI-enabled drug discovery. According to chief executive Colin Hill, the company had considered the transition several years earlier but delayed it while further developing its core technology.

Following the rebranding, Aitia expanded its drug-discovery collaborations with multiple pharmaceutical companies. Among the publicly announced agreements was a collaboration with UCB to apply Aitia's causal AI platform to Huntington's disease. In November 2023, Aitia entered a strategic agreement agreement with Charles River Laboratories to use Logica, a drug-discovery platform developed by Charles River and Valo Health, in its neurological-disease and oncology programs. The arrangement was intended to support the development of drug candidates from targets identified using Aitia's causal AI-based platforms.

By August 2024, Aitia had expanded its collaboration with Servier to include pancreatic cancer, Parkinson's disease, and glioma. A new collaboration with Orion Pharma was begun in September across multiple oncology indications. Aitia also started a new pan-cancer research effort with Gustave Roussy, a French comprehensive cancer center.

== Technology and applications ==
Aitia's causal artificial intelligence (AI) tools are based on the Turing Award-winning work on causality by Judea Pearl. The AI tools are used to build "digital twin" models of disease from multiomic and clinical patient data for use in target discovery, drug discovery and drug development in collaboration with pharmaceutical companies.

Aitia's primary technologies are the Reverse Engineering/Forward Simulation (REFS) causal inference engine and the Gemini Digital Twin (GDT) platform, the first GDT being for multiple myeloma. The company states that REFS incorporates human patient data rather than cell lines or animal models to build in silico models of the biology underlying human health and diseases), which in turn can be analyzed and tested to find causal relationships between molecular changes and disease outcomes. These findings can then be used as the basis for drug and/or diagnostic discovery and development.

According to Aitia, the REFS and GDT platforms have been applied to multiple myeloma, pancreatic cancer, glioma, prostate and other cancers, neurodegenerative diseases including Alzheimer's Disease, Parkinson’s Disease, Huntington’s Disease, and ALS, cardiometabolic disorders, and several immunological diseases. Peer-reviewed publications include studies of metabolic-syndrome risk, Parkinson's disease progression, cancer biomarkers, atherosclerosis, hypoglycemia risk in type 2 diabetes, and asthma drug response, among others.
