= Colonialism =

Control by distant groups

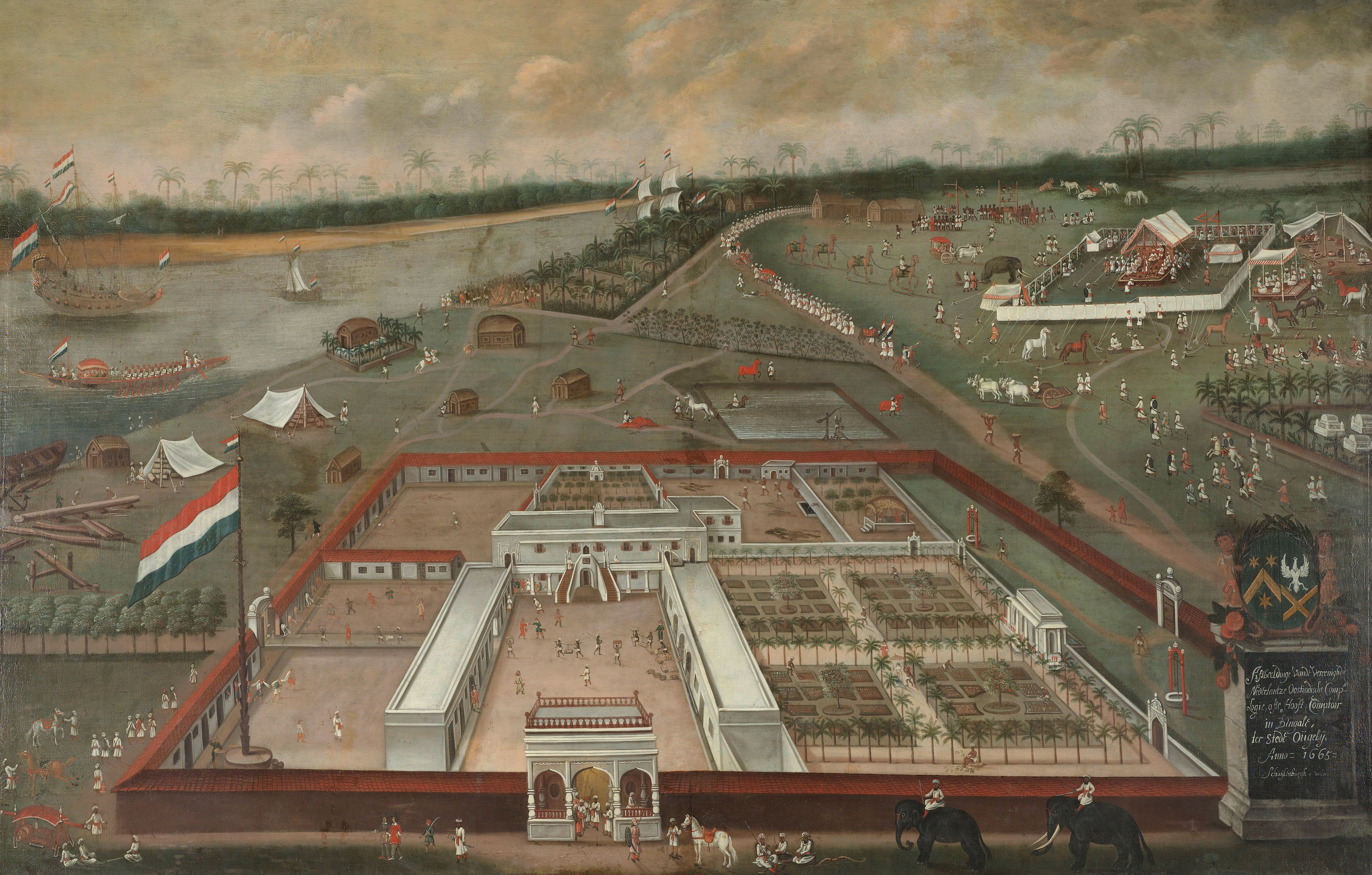
A 1665 illustration of a Dutch East India Company factory in Hugli-Chuchura, depicting various elements of colonialism, including its hierarchies and impact on the colonized and their lands

Colonialism is the practice of extending and maintaining political, social, economic, and cultural domination over a territory and its people by another people in pursuit of interests defined in an often distant metropole, who also claim superiority. While frequently an imperialist project, colonialism functions through differentiating between the targeted land and people, and that of the colonizers (a critical component of colonization). Rather than annexation, this typically culminates in organizing the colonized into colonies separate to the colonizers' metropole. Colonialism sometimes deepens by developing settler colonialism, whereby settlers from one or multiple colonizing metropoles occupy a territory with the intention of partially or completely supplanting the existing Indigenous peoples, possibly amounting to genocide.

While different forms of colonialism have existed around the world, the concept has been developed as a description of European colonial empires of the modern era. These spread globally from the 15th century to the mid-20th century, spanning 35% of Earth's land by 1800 and peaking at 84% by the beginning of World War I. European colonialism employed mercantilism and chartered companies, and established complex colonialities. Colonialism was in some cases justified with beliefs of having a civilizing mission to cultivate land and life, historically often rooted in the belief of a Christian mission.

Decolonization, which started in the 18th century, gradually led to the independence of colonies in waves, with a particular large wave of decolonizations happening in the aftermath of World War II between 1945 and 1975. Colonialism has a persistent impact on a wide range of modern outcomes, as scholars have shown that variations in colonial institutions can account for variations in economic development, regime types, and state capacity. Some academics have used the term neocolonialism to describe the continuation or imposition of elements of colonial rule through indirect means in the contemporary period.

== Etymology ==
Colonialism is etymologically derived from the Latin term colonia, originally a designation for a type of city or outpost that was founded and populated by newly settled Roman citizens at the direction of the Roman government. The word colonia is then in turn derived from the Latin word colonus ("farmer") and its root word colere ("to cultivate, to till").

== Definitions ==
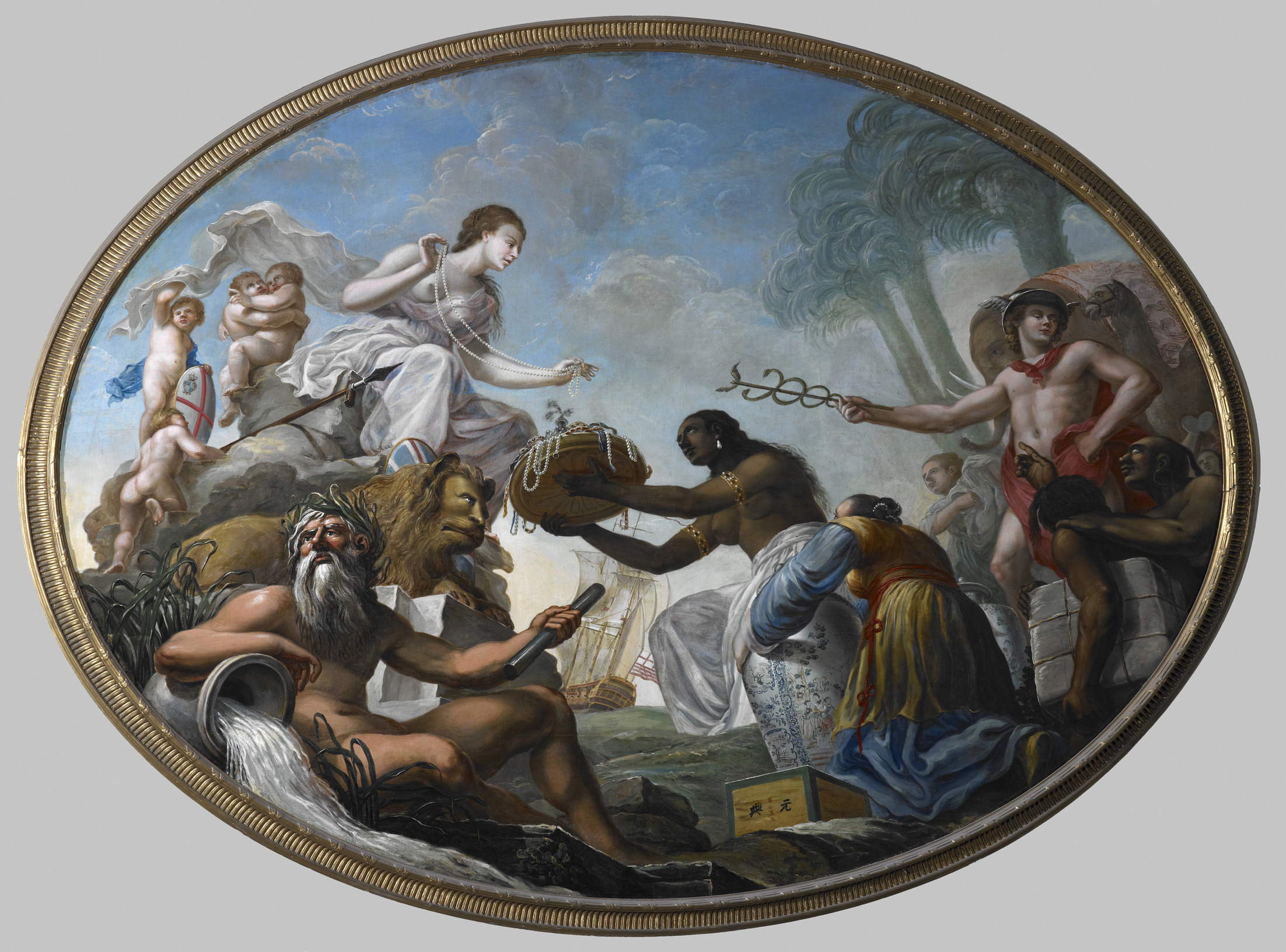
The East Offering its Riches to Britannia, painted by Spiridione Roma for the boardroom of the British East India Company

The earliest uses of colonialism referred to plantations that men emigrated to and settled. The term expanded its meaning in the early 20th century to act as a historical reference for European imperial expansion and the imperialist subjection of Asian and African peoples, while also serving as a paradigm for analysing the form of rule. Defining colonialism became necessary for the international anti-colonial movement, and it was discussed in the 1955 Bandung Conference and the contexts it applied to disputed. The concept entered the forefront of academia in the late 20th century, followed by the development of postcolonialism.

Collins English Dictionary defines colonialism as "the practice by which a powerful country directly controls less powerful countries and uses their resources to increase its own power and wealth". Webster's Encyclopedic Dictionary defined colonialism as "the policy of a nation seeking to extend or retain its authority over other people or territories". The online Merriam-Webster Dictionary offers several definitions: "domination of a people or area by a foreign state or nation", "the practice of extending and maintaining a nation's political and economic control over another people or area" and "the policy of or belief in acquiring and retaining colonies".

The Stanford Encyclopedia of Philosophy defines it as "a practice of domination, which involves the subjugation of one people to another" and uses the term "to describe the process of European settlement and political control over the rest of the world, including the Americas, Australia, and parts of Africa and Asia". It discusses the distinction between colonialism, imperialism, and conquest and states that "[t]he difficulty of defining colonialism stems from the fact that the term is often used as a synonym for imperialism. Both colonialism and imperialism were forms of conquest that were expected to benefit Europe economically and strategically".

In his preface to Jürgen Osterhammel's Colonialism: A Theoretical Overview, Roger Tignor says "For Osterhammel, the essence of colonialism is the existence of colonies, which are by definition governed differently from other territories such as protectorates or informal spheres of influence." In the book, Osterhammel asks, "How can 'colonialism' be defined independently from 'colony?'" He settles on a three-sentence definition:

Colonialism is a relationship between an indigenous (or forcibly imported) majority and a minority of foreign invaders. The fundamental decisions affecting the lives of the colonised people are made and implemented by the colonial rulers in pursuit of interests that are often defined in a distant metropolis. Rejecting cultural compromises with the colonised population, the colonisers are convinced of their own superiority and their ordained mandate to rule.

According to Julian Go, "Colonialism refers to the direct political control of a society and its people by a foreign ruling state... The ruling state monopolizes political power and keeps the subordinated society and its people in a legally inferior position." He also writes, "colonialism depends first and foremost upon the declaration of sovereignty and/or territorial seizure by a core state over another territory and its inhabitants who are classified as inferior subjects rather than equal citizens."

Australian historian Lorenzo Veracini defines colonialism as the establishment and maintenance of an unequal relationship between a colonial metropole and a colonized territory through violence and argues that colonialism is sustained as an unequal relationship through the essential forces of displacement and violence. The imbalance of power that results from a colonial relationship allows a colonial metropole to exploit unequal trading terms between it and its colonies.

Wendell Bell in The Encyclopedic Dictionary of Sociology describes colonialism (incl. internal colonialism) as a "a process by which [...] dominance is acquired and held by a foreign power over another people and land". This definition is cited and complemented by the International Encyclopedia of the Social & Behavioral Sciences, clarifying that the rule of colonialism is different to annexation as it does not involve actual incorporation.

In A Dictionary of Human Geography colonialism is described as control over another people accompanied by an ideology of superiority and racism.

Colonial studies have been criticized for Eurocentrism in determining the threshold between colonialism versus conquest.

== Types of colonialism ==
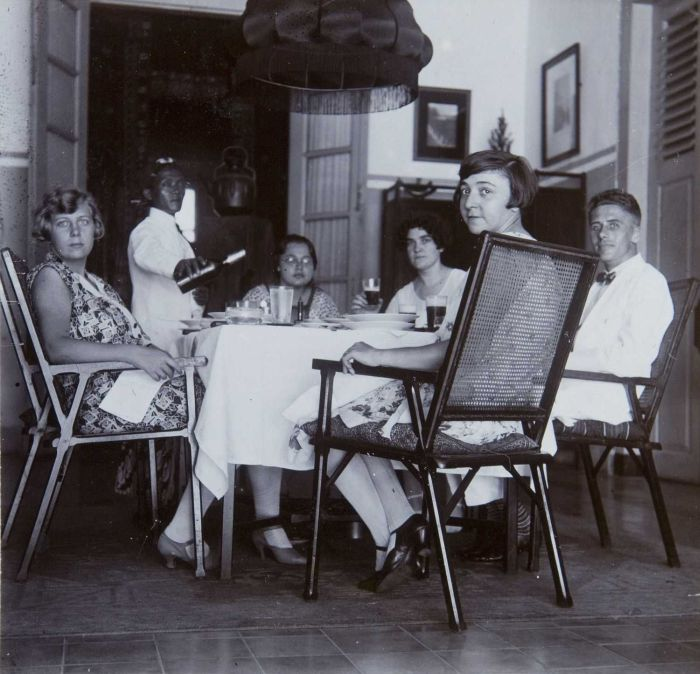
Dutch family in Java, 1927

Modern studies of colonialism distinguish between various overlapping categories of colonialism, broadly classified into four types: settler colonialism, exploitation colonialism, surrogate colonialism, and internal colonialism. Some historians have identified other forms of colonialism, including national and trade forms.

- Settler colonialism involves large-scale immigration by settlers to colonies, often motivated by religious, political, or economic reasons. This form of colonialism aims largely to supplant prior existing populations with a settler one, and involves large number of settlers emigrating to colonies for the purpose of establishing settlements. Argentina, Australia, Brazil, Canada, Chile, China, Israel, New Zealand, Northern Ireland, Russia, South Africa, the United States, and Uruguay, are examples of nations created or expanded in their contemporary form by settler colonialism. French-controlled Algeria, Rhodesia (now Zimbabwe), Italian-controlled Libya, the Kenya Colony, Japanese-controlled Korea and Manchuria, and most infamously Nazi-occupied Eastern Europe are examples of past or failed attempts to establish settler colonies.
- Exploitation colonialism involves fewer colonists and focuses on the exploitation of natural resources or labour to the benefit of the metropole. This form consists of trading posts as well as larger colonies where colonists would constitute much of the political and economic administration. The European colonization of Africa and Asia was largely conducted under the auspices of exploitation colonialism.
- Surrogate colonialism involves a settlement project supported by a colonial power, in which most of the settlers do not come from the same ethnic group as the ruling power, as it has been (controversially) argued was the case of Mandatory Palestine and the Colony of Liberia.
- Internal colonialism is a notion of uneven structural power between areas of a state. The source of exploitation comes from within the state. This is demonstrated in the way control and exploitation may pass from people from the colonizing country to an immigrant population within a newly independent country.

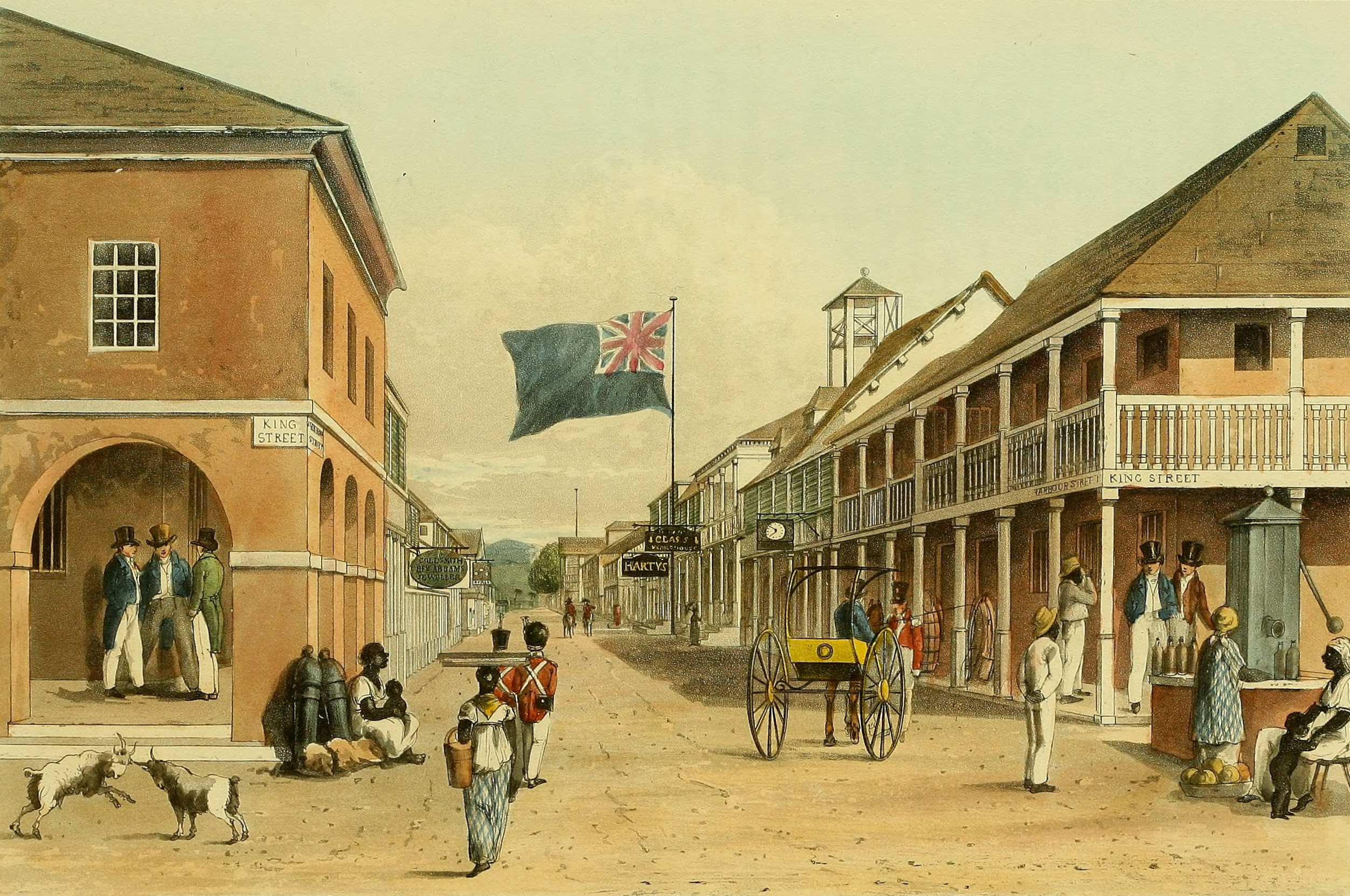
Harbour Street, Kingston, Jamaica, c. 1820

- National colonialism is a process involving elements of both settler and internal colonialism, in which nation-building and colonization are symbiotically connected, with the colonial regime seeking to remake the colonized peoples into their own cultural and political image. The goal is to integrate them into the state, but only as reflections of the state's preferred culture. The Taiwan under the Kuomintang's military dictatorship is the archetypal example of a national-colonialist society.
- Trade colonialism involves the undertaking of colonialist ventures in support of trade opportunities for merchants. This form of colonialism was most prominent in 19th-century Asia, where previously isolationist states were forced to open their ports to Western powers. Examples of this include the Opium Wars and the opening of Japan.

=== Versus imperialism ===
Imperialism and colonialism have been distinguished by scholars such as Young who wrote that imperialism implements state policy, while colonialism may reflect commercial intentions, although supported by force. Said stated that colonialism implies geographic separation between the colony and the imperial power. He distinguished them, stating, "imperialism involved 'the practice, the theory and the attitudes of a dominating metropolitan center ruling a distant territory', while colonialism refers to the 'settlements on a distant territory.'" Contiguous land empires such as the Russian, Chinese or Ottoman have traditionally been called imperialist, although they also sent populations into their remote territories.

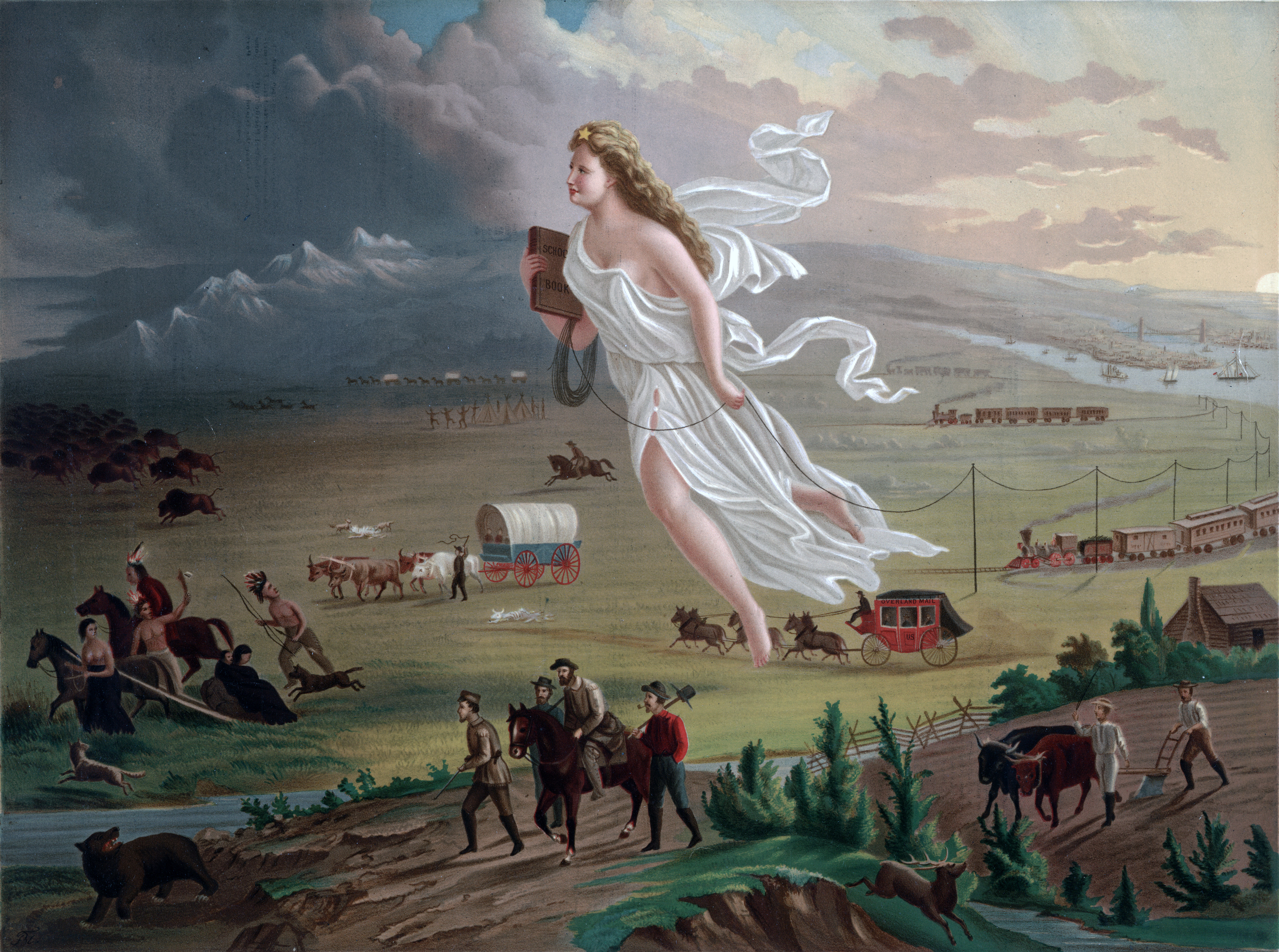
American Progress (1872) by John Gast is an allegorical representation of the idea of manifest destiny. Columbia, a personification of the United States, leads settler civilization westward, bringing light, stringing telegraph wire, holding a book, and highlighting different stages of economic activity and evolving forms of transportation, while on the left, displacing Native Americans in the United States from their homeland.

== History ==
=== Antiquity ===
Activity that could be called colonialism has a long history, starting at least as early as the ancient Egyptians. Phoenicians, Greeks, and Romans founded colonies in antiquity. Phoenicia had an enterprising maritime trading-culture that spread across the Mediterranean from 1550 BC to 300 BC; later the Persian Empire and various Greek city-states continued on this line of setting up colonies. The Romans would soon follow, setting up coloniae throughout the Mediterranean, in North Africa, and in Western Asia.

=== Medieval ===
Beginning in the 7th century, Islamic caliphates engaged in widespread imperial expansion and settler colonialism, conquering the Levant, Mesopotamia, Persia, North Africa, and the Iberian Peninsula. Arab-Islamic colonization involved the military subjugation of indigenous populations (including Berbers, Copts, Persians and others), the large-scale appropriation of land, resource extraction, the imposition of discriminatory taxation (jizya) on non-Muslim subjects, and linguistic and cultural Arabization. The conquests were followed by large-scale Arab migration and permanent settler-colonialism in conquered territories. New or expanded garrison cities such as Kufa, Basra, Fustat and Kairouan concentrated conquering armies, serving as bases for colonial control.

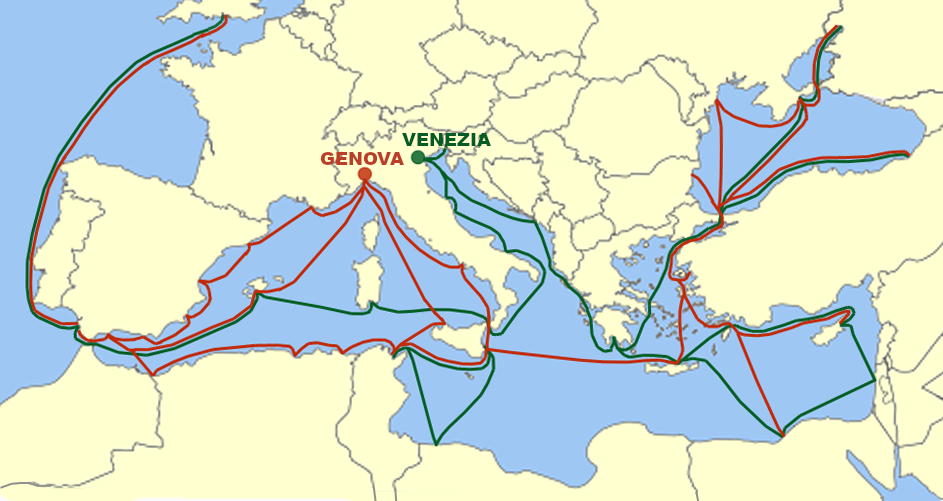
Venetian and Genoese colonies and trade routes across the Mediterranean Sea

The indigenous populations were incorporated on unequal terms. Early surrender settlements generally exchanged limited communal autonomy for political submission and taxation, while the system of dhimma made non-Muslim subjects second-class citizens. The early caliphates were dominated by an Arab-Muslim elite, and non-Arabs were subjected to fiscal, social and political discrimination. The colonization also generated enslavement and ethnic displacement on a large scale. Captives were transported into caliphal centres, and enslaved non-Muslim populations made up a significant part of Islamic societies.

From the 9th century Vikings (Norsemen) such as Leif Erikson established colonies in Britain, Ireland, Iceland, Greenland, North America, present-day Russia and Ukraine, France (Normandy) and Sicily. In the 9th century a new wave of Mediterranean colonisation began, with competitors such as the Venetians, Genovese and Amalfians infiltrating the wealthy previously Byzantine or Eastern Roman islands and lands. European Crusaders set up colonial regimes in Outremer (in the Levant, 1097–1291) and in the Baltic littoral (12th century onwards). Venice began to dominate Dalmatia and reached its greatest nominal colonial extent at the conclusion of the Fourth Crusade in 1204, with the declaration of the acquisition of three octaves of the Byzantine Empire.

=== Modern ===
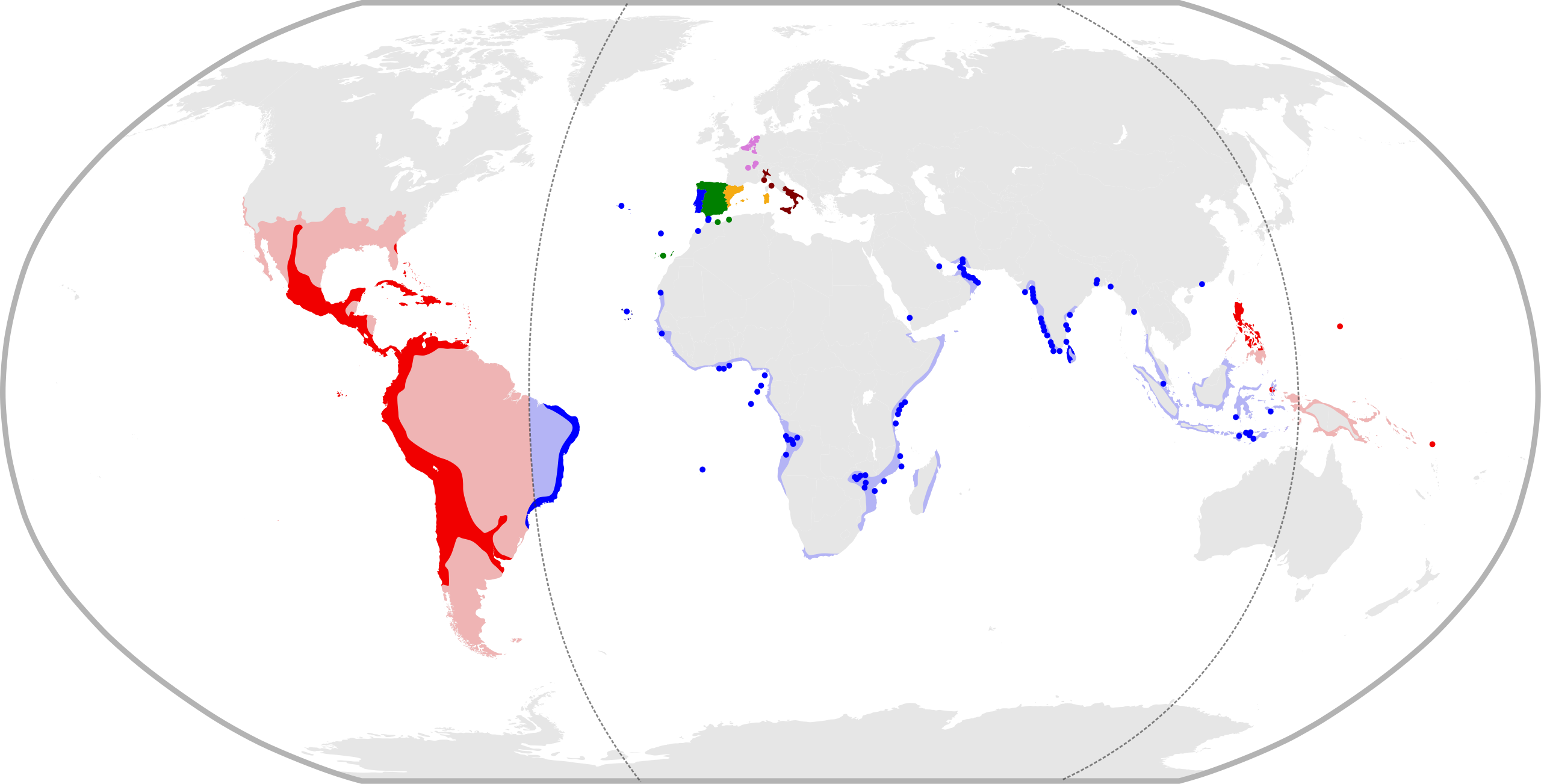
Iberian Union of Spain and Portugal between 1580 and 1640

Modern colonialism is generally considered to have begun with the Spanish conquest of the Canary Islands when "the relationships involved in domination became recognisably colonial." Following the fall of Constantinople to the Ottoman Empire in 1453, the sea routes discovered by Portuguese Prince Henry the Navigator (1394–1460) became central to trade, and helped fuel the Age of Discovery. The Crown of Castile encountered the Americas in 1492 through sea travel and built trading posts or conquered large extents of land. The Treaty of Tordesillas divided the areas of these "new" lands between the Spanish Empire and the Portuguese Empire in 1494.

The 17th century saw the birth of the Dutch Empire and French colonial empire, as well as the English overseas possessions, which later became the British Empire. It also saw the establishment of Danish overseas colonies and Swedish overseas colonies.

A first wave of separatism started with the American Revolutionary War (1775–1783), initiating the Rise of the "Second" British Empire (1783–1815). The Spanish Empire largely collapsed in the Americas with the Spanish American wars of independence (1808–1833). Empire-builders established several new colonies after this time, including in the German colonial empire and Belgian colonial empire. Starting with the end of the French Revolution European authors such as Johann Gottfried Herder, August von Kotzebue, and Heinrich von Kleist prolifically published so as to conjure up sympathy for the oppressed native peoples and the slaves of the new world, thereby starting the idealization of native humans.

The Habsburg monarchy, the Russian Empire, and the Ottoman Empire existed at the same time but did not expand over oceans. Rather, these empires expanded through the conquest of neighbouring territories. There was, though, some Russian colonization of North America across the Bering Strait. The Empire of Brazil fought for hegemony in South America. The United States gained overseas territories after the 1898 Spanish–American War, hence, the coining of the term "American imperialism". The Ottoman Empire functioned as a major land-based imperial power, conquering and ruling extensive territories across the Balkans, West Asia, and North Africa. Ottoman expansion and rule have been analyzed by scholars in colonial terms, particularly its territorial ambitions in Africa during the 19th century. Ottoman rule involved the extraction of taxes and resources and coercive practices such as the devshirme, through which Christian children were taken from their families, forcibly converted to Islam, and pushed into the Ottoman military and administration. Concurrently, the Omani Empire established a maritime imperial and colonial network across the Indian Ocean. Oman conquered much of the Swahili Coast, while the Omani colony of Zanzibar was made the center of a colonial system based heavily on plantation agriculture, enslaved labor, and the slave and ivory trades.

The Japanese colonial empire began in the mid-19th century with the settler colonization of Hokkaido and the destruction of the island's indigenous Ainu people before moving onto the Ryukyu Islands (the indigenous Ryukyuan people survived colonization more intact). After the Meiji Restoration, Japan more formally developed its colonial policies with the help of European advisors. The stated purpose from the beginning was to compensate for the lack of resources on the main islands of Japan by securing control over natural resources in Asia for its own economic development and industrialization, not unlike its European counterparts. Japan defeated China in the First Sino-Japanese War to control Korea and the island of Formosa, now Taiwan, and later fought off the Russian Empire to control Port Arthur and South Sakhalin.

In the late 19th century, many European powers became involved in the Scramble for Africa.

=== 20th century ===
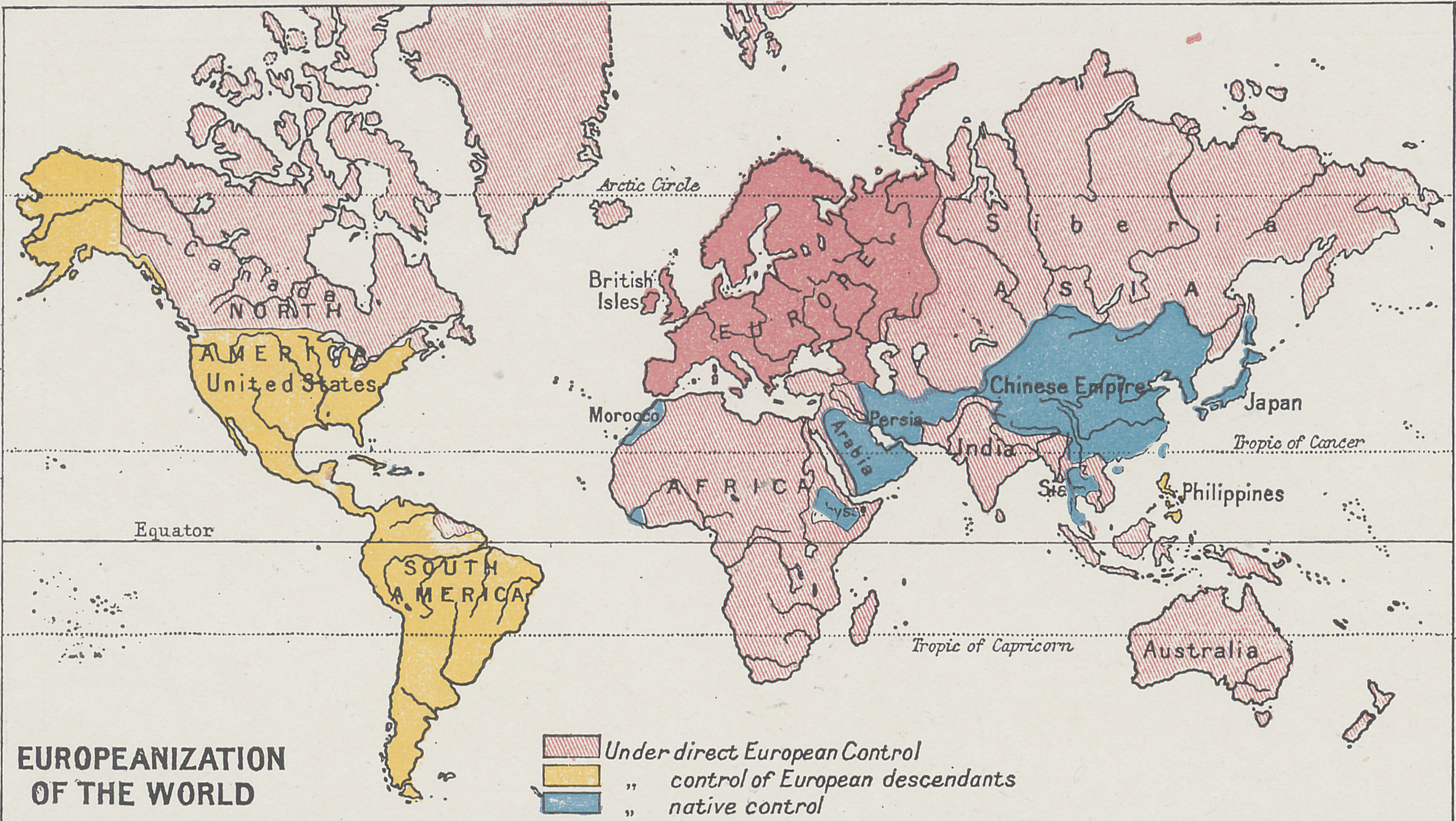
The Harmsworth atlas and Gazetter 1908 European colonization map

The world's colonial population at the outbreak of the World War I – a high point for colonialism – totalled about 560 million people, of whom 70% lived in British possessions, 10% in French possessions, 9% in Dutch possessions, 4% in Japanese possessions, 2% in German possessions, 2% in American possessions, 3% in Portuguese possessions, 1% in Belgian possessions and 0.5% in Italian possessions. The domestic domains of the colonial powers had a total population of about 370 million people. Outside Europe, few areas had remained without coming under formal colonial tutorship – and even Siam, China, Japan, Nepal, Afghanistan, Persia, and Abyssinia had felt varying degrees of Western colonial-style influence – concessions, unequal treaties, extraterritoriality and the like.

Asking whether colonies paid, economic historian Grover Clark (1891–1938) argues an emphatic "No!" He reports that in every case the support cost, especially the military system necessary to support and defend colonies, outran the total trade they produced. Apart from the British Empire, they did not provide favoured destinations for the immigration of surplus metropole populations. The question of whether colonies paid is a complicated one when recognizing the multiplicity of interests involved. In some cases colonial powers paid a lot in military costs while private investors pocketed the benefits. In other cases the colonial powers managed to move the burden of administrative costs to the colonies themselves by imposing taxes.

In many instances, colonialism involved widespread violence against indigenous populations. Notable examples include the Algerian genocide (1830–1903) by France, during which scorched-earth tactics, massacres, and disease resulted in the deaths of an estimated 500,000 to 1,000,000 Algerians; the Belgian atrocities in the Congo Free State (1885–1908) which caused a population decline from 1.2 million to 10 million people; the Herero and Nama genocide in German South West Africa (1904–1908), where German forces killed between 40,000 and 80,000 Herero and 10,000 Nama people; and British colonial actions such as the use of concentration camps during the Second Boer War (1899–1902), in which tens of thousands of Boer and Black African civilians died from disease and starvation, as well as by the devastating famines and violence under British rule in India and the suppression of the Mau Mau rebellion in Kenya (1952–1960).

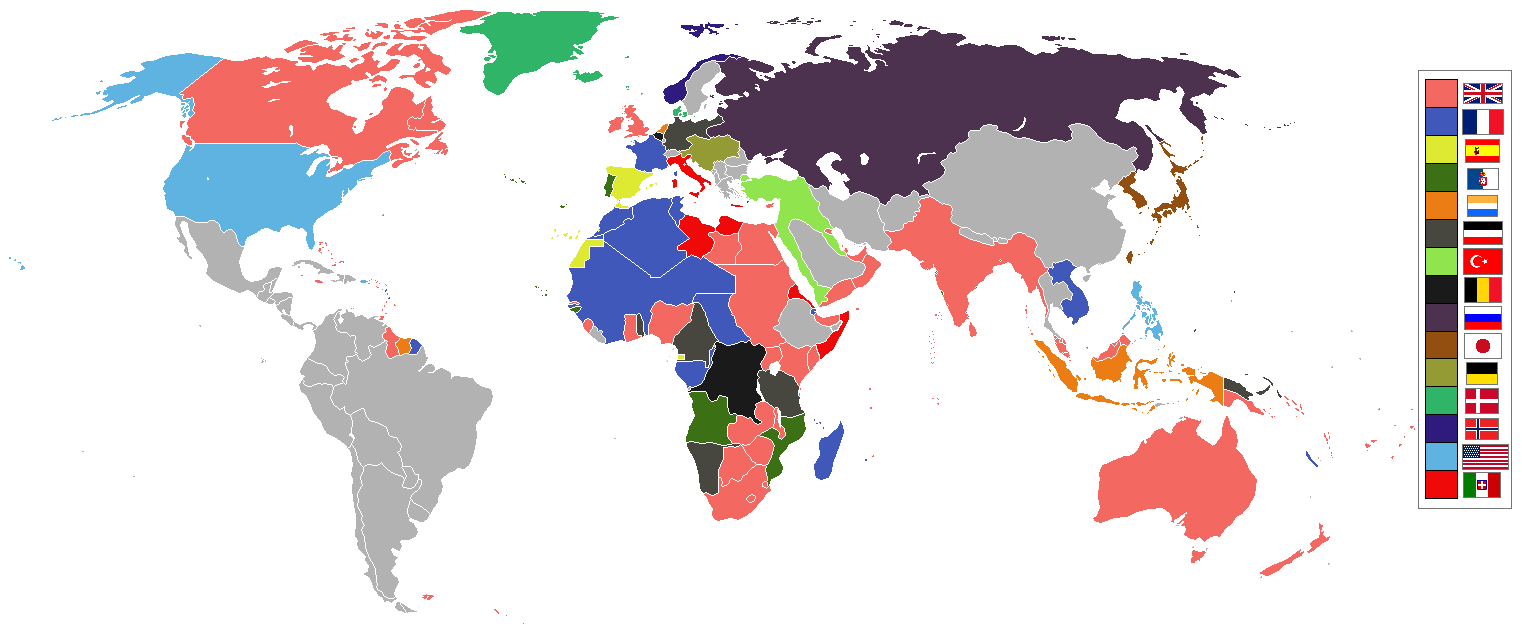
Map of colonial and land-based empires throughout the world in 1914

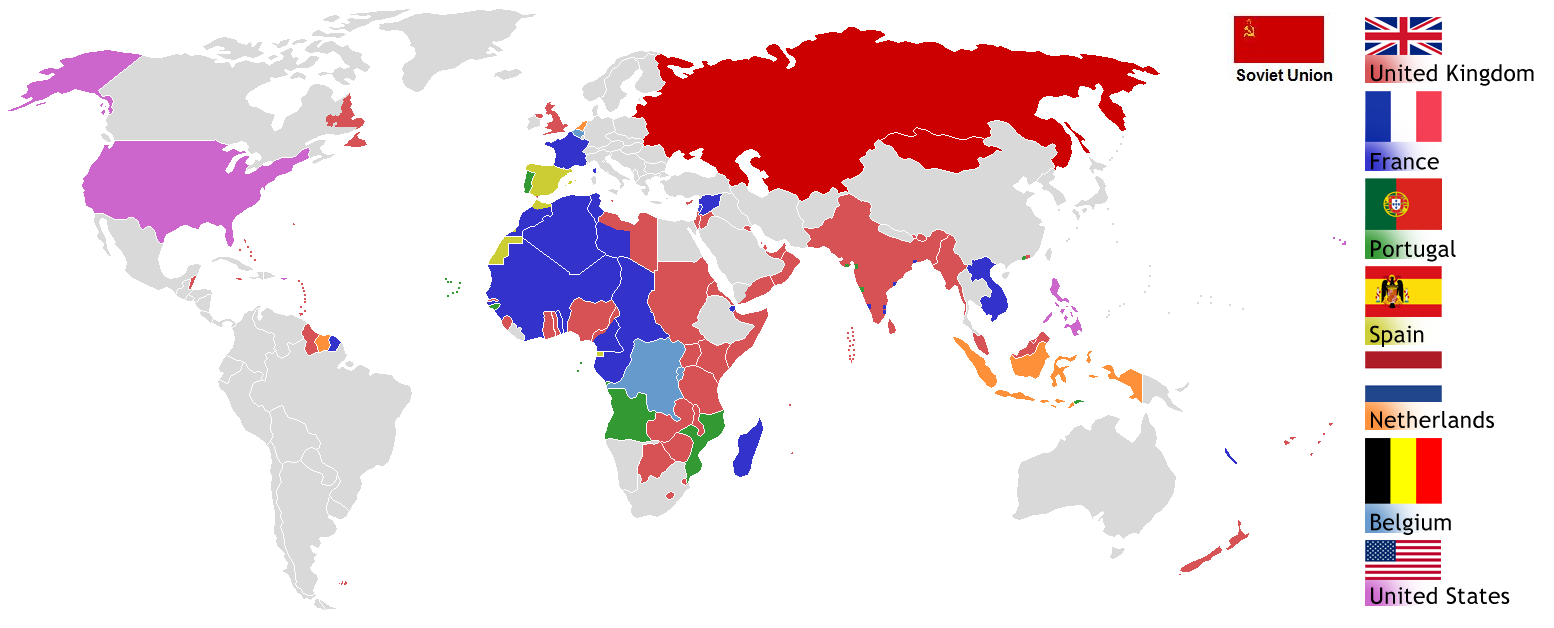
Imperial powers in 1945

==== World War I ====
The First World War brought the European colonial empires into conflict with each other with the fight sustained by their colonial territories. War mobilization heightened colonial exploitation globally, sparking several anticolonial uprisings in response to forced conscription. Germany capitulated in large part due to the Allied sea blockade cutting off access to its overseas colonies, a disadvantage which German U-boats could not inflict on the Allies. The victorious Allies divided up the German colonial empire and much of the Ottoman Empire between themselves as League of Nations mandates, grouping these territories into three classes according to how quickly it was deemed that they could prepare for independence. The empires of Russia and Austria collapsed in 1917–1918, and the Soviet empire emerged.

==== Interwar years ====
Anticolonial sentiment surged during the interwar years. The Easter Rising and Irish War of Independence led to the UK conceding independence to Ireland. Turkey became an independent country in the ruins of the Ottoman Empire and fought off interventions from Britain, France, and Italy. The first Pan-African Congress would take place in Paris in 1919. The Soviet Union positioned itself as "an explicitly anti-imperialist power" and would play an important role in the success of anticolonial resistance movements in Asia and Africa. The Third Socialist International settled the question of colonialism and the decision was made to instruct socialists to ally with anticolonial nationalist forces in the colonized world regardless of their position on Marxism. Anticolonial resistance movements gained power and followers through a mix of legal and illegal methods

However, despite the rise in anticolonial sentiment, colonial powers still retained and expanded their grip on colonial territories. Any anticolonial opposition from colonized subjects, non-violent or otherwise, was met with brutal violence. South Africa, which was the result of settler colonization by the Dutch and later the English, became independent and included with-it modern-day Angola. Just under two decades later the new state would legally codify segregation in the Apartheid legislation. Japan seized Manchuria from China where it set up the puppet state of Manchukuo and both exploited natural resources for mainland industrialization and enacted a program of settler colonialism with the stated goal being the import of five million Japanese settlers. The Soviet Union despite branding itself as anti-imperialist and providing real material assistance to anticolonial resistance returned to its previous colonial "Russification" policies after 1930. Zionist settler colonization of Palestine continued expansion, now with the backing of the British empire after issuing the Balfour Declaration in 1917 and establishing the British Mandate for Palestine at the League of Nations. Several League of Nations Mandates were established which ostensibly promised independence to former colonies after a certain time period but which were under full control of a colonial power and in practice acted as a buffer period for the colonial power to set up a collaborationist regime for post-independence.

In many ways conditions for colonized peoples also deteriorated. Settler colonialism and its accompanying logic of elimination vastly expanded in colonies such as Manchuria, Kenya, Mozambique, Palestine, Algeria, Libya, Angola and several others. Colonial powers having refined their methods of control over the era began to mix aspects of exploitation colonialism and settler colonialism, thus exacerbating colonial violence.

==== World War II ====
Many interpret World War II as an attempt by Nazi Germany and its allies to colonize the whole European continent, especially in the east. Lorenzo Veracini writes, "The global history of colonialism can be seen as bookended by two fateful moments: European armies crossed the Strait of Gibraltar in the fifteenth century to establish unequal relations of domination in Africa, and a colonial army crossed it in the opposite direction in 1936, to conquer the metropole and pursue a civil war that subjected the metropolitan populations with a violence that had been until then reserved for restive colonized subjects." Adam Tooze posits that Operation Barbarossa is "far better understood as the last great land-grab in the long and bloody history of European colonialism." He further writes, "From the moment that Germany invaded Poland in September 1939, the genocidal impulses of Nazi ideology towards both the Jews and the Slavs had taken on concrete form in an extraordinary programme of population displacement and colonial settlement." Generalplan Ost, the Nazi government's plan for the settler colonization of Eastern Europe, called for the mass murder and deportation of at least 30 million Slavs from Poland and the western Soviet Union in preparation for the importation of millions of German settlers. The plan was lauded as a 'solution' to secure Germany's food supply for the duration of the war unlike in World War I and to end Germany's dependence on food imports to feed its large population. Hitler repeatedly drew parallels between the colonization plan and Manifest Destiny in the United States. Aimé Césaire argues in Discourse on Colonialism, "[Europeans] tolerated that Nazism before it was inflicted on them, they absolved it, shut their eyes to it, legitimized it, because, until then, it had been applied only to non-European peoples."

The colonial violence of World War II was not limited to Europe. Prior to the war, Italy expanded its colonial settlement program in Libya. Italy perpetrated the Libyan genocide between 1929 and 1934 during and after the Second Italo-Senussi War. Up to 100,000 Libyans were killed, particularly Bedouins in the Cyrenaica region. Italy lost control of Libya in 1943 to the British during the North African campaign of World War II. Italy also invaded and occupied Ethiopia in 1935 where it enacted a system of segregation between Italian colonists and indigenous Ethiopians. Japan temporarily took control of European controlled colonies in Southeast Asia in order to overcome the sanctions placed on it that disrupted access to the resources of said colonies.

==== Post-WWII decolonization ====
In the aftermath of World War II, decolonisation progressed rapidly. The tumultuous upheaval of the war significantly weakened the major colonial powers, and they quickly lost control of colonies such as Singapore, India, and Libya. In addition, the United Nations shows support for decolonisation in its 1945 charter. In 1960, the UN issued the Declaration on the Granting of Independence to Colonial Countries and Peoples, which affirmed its stance (though notably, colonial empires such as France, Spain, the United Kingdom, and the United States abstained).

The word "neocolonialism" originated from Jean-Paul Sartre in 1956, to refer to a variety of contexts since the decolonisation that took place after World War II. Generally it does not refer to a type of direct colonisation – rather to colonialism or colonial-style exploitation by other means. Specifically, neocolonialism may refer to the theory that former or existing economic relationships, such as the General Agreement on Tariffs and Trade and the Central American Free Trade Agreement, or the operations of companies (such as Royal Dutch Shell in Nigeria and Brunei) fostered by former colonial powers were or are used to maintain control of former colonies and dependencies after the colonial independence movements of the post–World War II period. The term became popular in ex-colonies in the late 20th century.

=== Contemporary ===
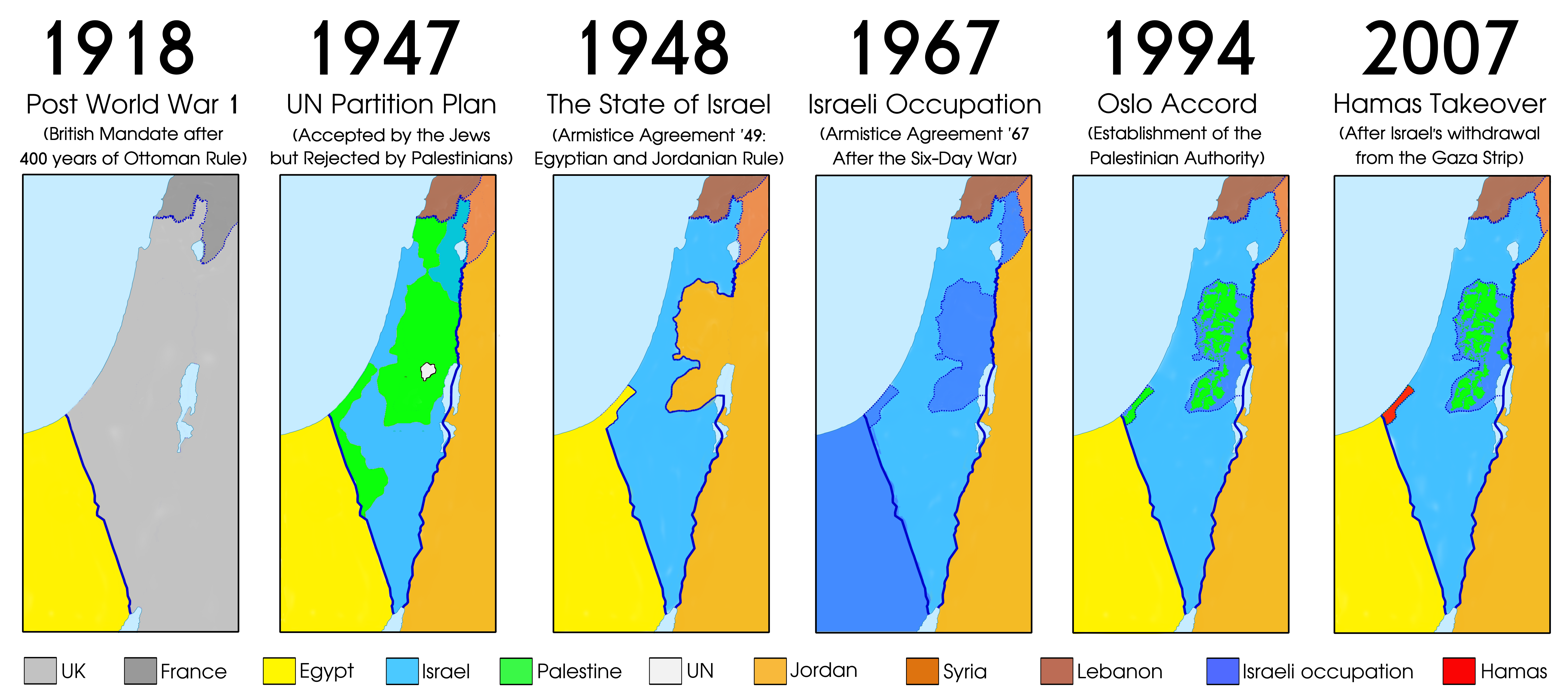
Change in the borders of Israel and Palestine over time, showing the extent of Israeli control of territory formerly identified as Palestine.

While colonies of contiguous empires have been historically excluded, they can be seen as colonies. Contemporary expansion of colonies is seen by some in case of Russian imperialism and Chinese imperialism. Zionism is considered a modern colonialist movement, although it began in the 20th century. It has been categorized by some scholars as a settler colonialist movement.

Chinese rule over East Turkistan, administered since 1884 as Xinjiang ("New Territory"), has been analyzed by scholars as a form of Han settler colonialism, particularly through state-sponsored Han migration and the paramilitary Xinjiang Production and Construction Corps; the Han share of the population rose from under 5 percent in 1949 to around 42 percent by 2020. Sun Yat-sen had earlier proposed "the colonization of Mongolia and Sinkiang" in his 1920 work The International Development of China, and the region briefly asserted independence as the First East Turkestan Republic (1933–1934) and the Second East Turkestan Republic (1944–1949) before coming under PRC control in 1949. The East Turkistan Government in Exile, which in May 2026 petitioned the UN Special Committee on Decolonization to list the territory as a Non-Self-Governing Territory, argues that the persecution of Uyghurs, recognized as genocide by several governments and assessed by the UN as possibly amounting to crimes against humanity, is rooted in this colonial occupation.

== Impact ==
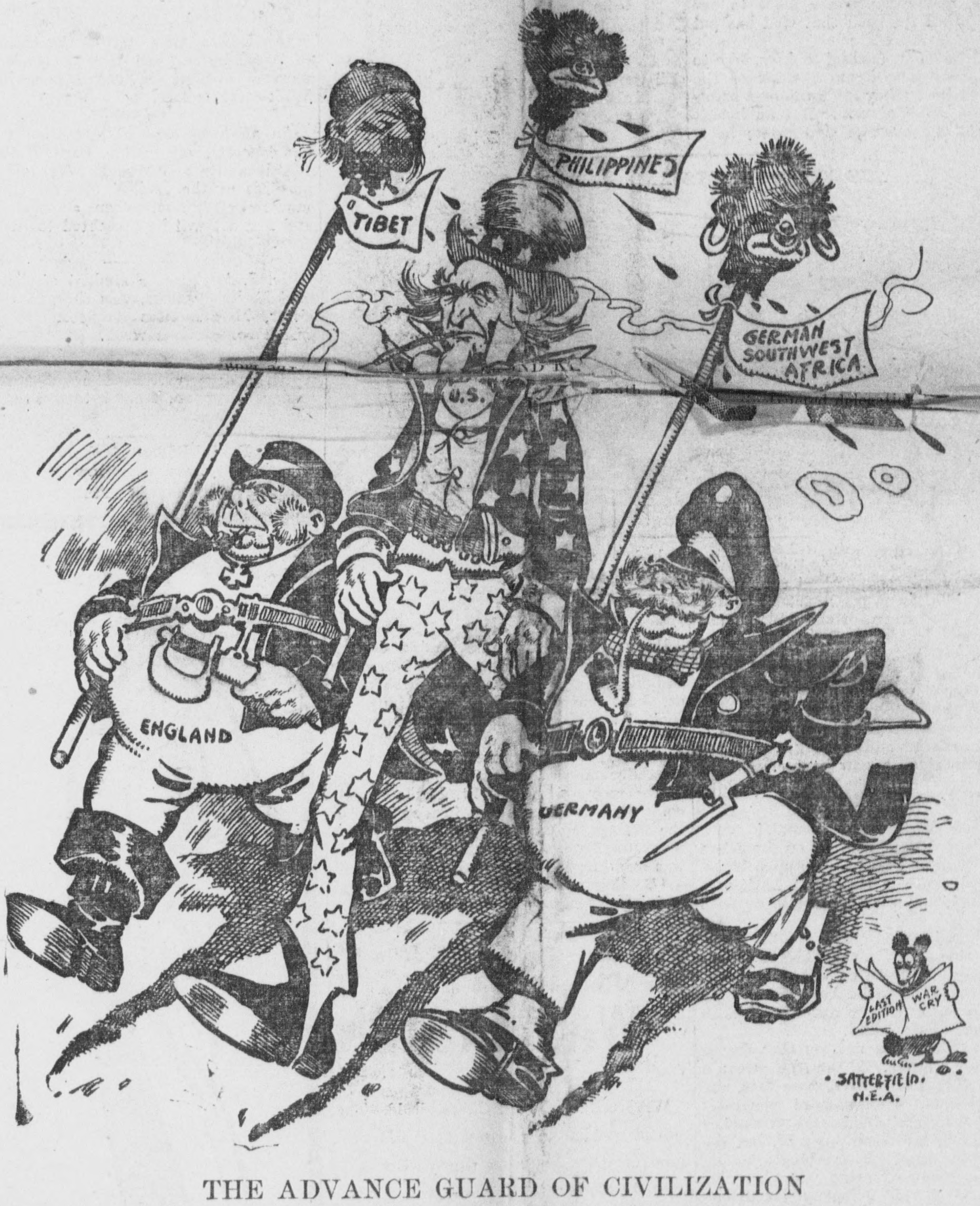
A 1904 cartoon by Bob Satterfield about the brutality committed by Western nations: the personifications of England, the United States, and Germany carrying spears topped by the severed heads of Tibet, the Philippines, and Southwest Africa respectively. The caption describes this as "The advance guard of civilization".

The Dutch Public Health Service provides medical care for the natives of the Dutch East Indies, May 1946.

The impacts of colonisation are immense and pervasive. Various effects, both immediate and protracted, include the spread of virulent diseases, causing pandemics, oppression, unequal social relations through othering and economically through exclusion, detribalization, appropriation, exploitation, enslavement, medical advances, the creation of new institutions, abolitionism, changing infrastructure, and technological progress. Colonial practices also spur the spread of conquerors' languages, literature and cultural institutions, while endangering or obliterating those of indigenous peoples, possibly amounting to genocide. Despite the colonial suppression and narrative, colonised people may be able to build on their agency, potentially having influence on the imperial country or even challenging it. Often though this has been met with cultural appropriation and forced assimilation.

With respect to international borders, Britain and France traced close to 40% of the entire length of the world's international boundaries.

=== Against local populations ===
When colonists settled in pre-populated areas, the societies and cultures of the people in those areas permanently changed. Colonial practices directly and indirectly forced the colonized peoples to abandon their traditional cultures and established complex systems of power, so-called colonialities. For example, European colonizers in the United States implemented the residential schools program to force native children to assimilate into the hegemonic culture.

Cultural colonialism gave rise to culturally and ethnically mixed populations such as the mestizos of the Americas, as well as racially divided populations such as those found in French Algeria or in Southern Rhodesia. In fact, everywhere where colonial powers established a consistent and continued presence, hybrid communities existed.

Notable examples in Asia include the Anglo-Burmese, Anglo-Indian, Burgher, Eurasian Singaporean, Filipino mestizo, Kristang, and Macanese peoples. In the Dutch East Indies (later Indonesia) the vast majority of "Dutch" settlers were in fact Eurasians known as Indo-Europeans, formally belonging to the European legal class in the colony.

=== Socioeconomic effects ===
Greek trade networks spread throughout the Mediterranean region while Roman trade expanded with the primary goal of directing tribute from the colonised areas towards the Roman metropole. According to Strabo, by the time of emperor Augustus, up to 120 Roman ships would set sail every year from Myos Hormos in Roman Egypt to India. With the development of trade routes under the Ottoman Empire,

Gujari Hindus, Syrian Muslims, Jews, Armenians, Christians from south and central Europe operated trading routes that supplied Persian and Arab horses to the armies of all three empires, Mocha coffee to Delhi and Belgrade, Persian silk to India and Istanbul.

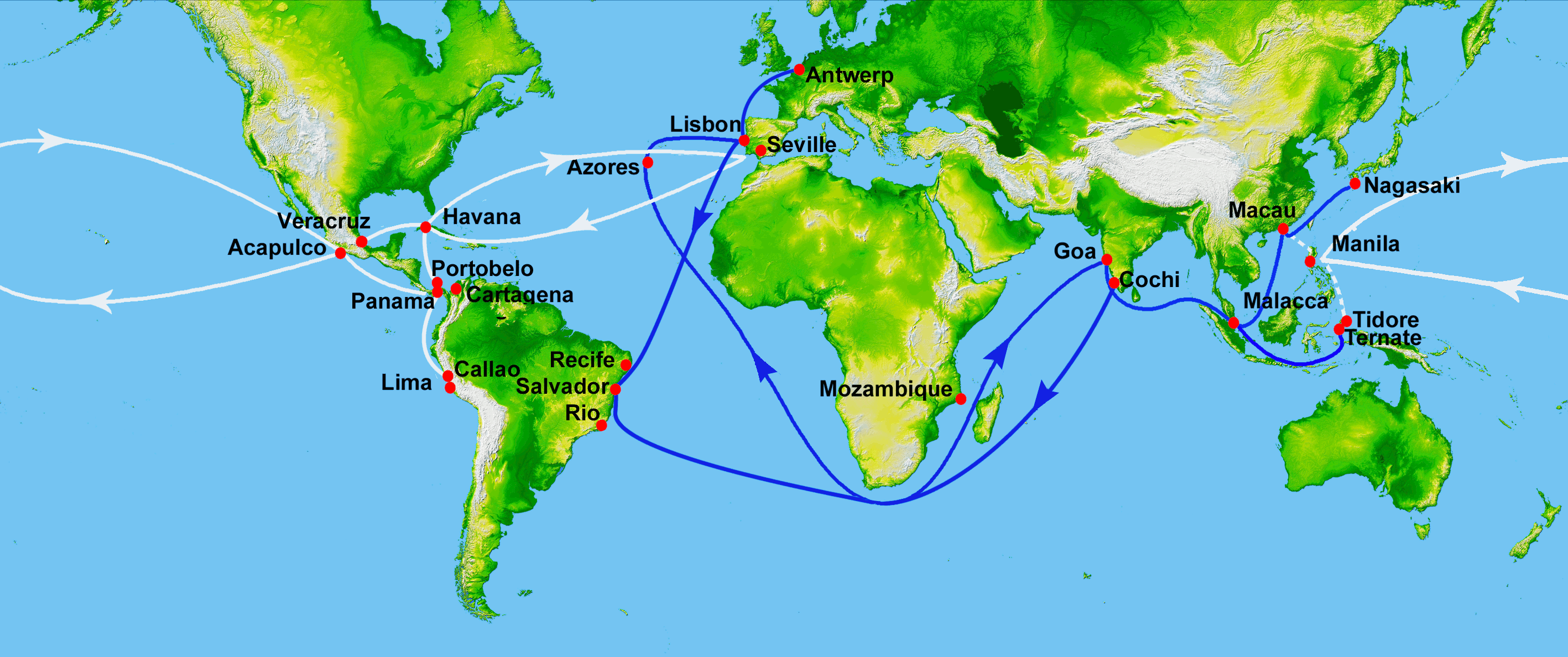
Portuguese trade routes (blue) and the rival Manila-Acapulco galleons trade routes (white) established in 1568

Aztec civilisation developed into an extensive empire that had the goal of exacting tribute from the conquered colonial areas. For the Aztecs, a significant tribute was the acquisition of sacrificial victims for their religious rituals.

The economic performance of colonies varies significantly. In "Institutions as a Fundamental Cause of Long-run Growth", economists Daron Acemoglu, Simon Johnson and James A. Robinson compare the economic influences of the European colonists on different colonies and study what could explain the huge discrepancies in previous European colonies, for example, between West African colonies like Sierra Leone and Hong Kong and Singapore. According to the paper, economic institutions are the determinant of the colonial success because they determine their financial performance and order for the distribution of resources. At the same time, these institutions are also consequences of political institutions – especially how de facto and de jure political power is allocated. To explain the different colonial cases, we thus need to look first into the political institutions that shaped the economic institutions.

Studies on life expectancy, human nutrition, and literacy showed the effect of colonialism on living standards was mixed with in many cases initial declines followed by improvements.

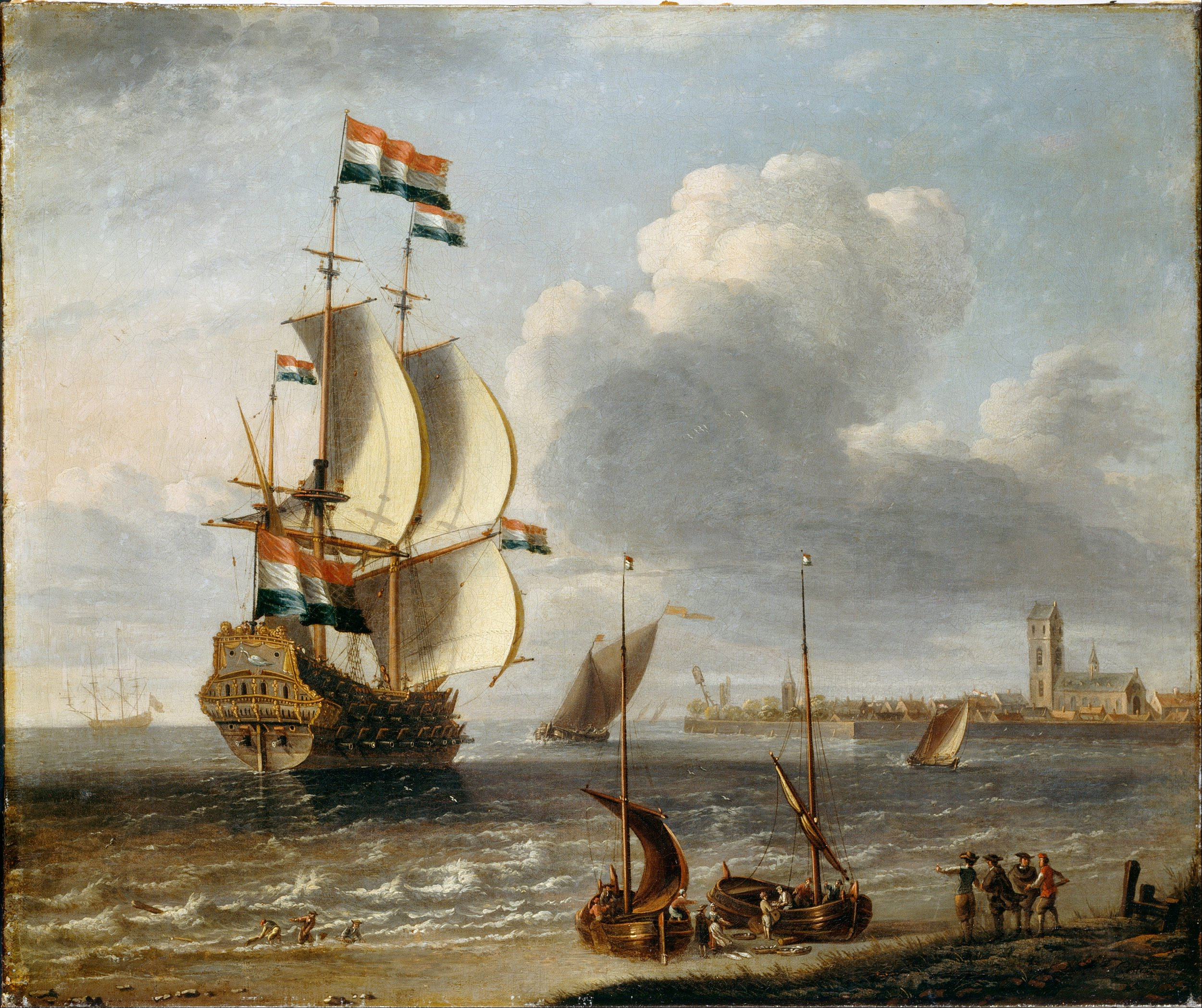
Dutch East India Company was the first-ever multinational corporation, financed by shares that established the first modern stock exchange.

For example, one interesting observation is "the Reversal of Fortune" – the less developed civilisations in 1500, like North America, Australia, and New Zealand, are now much richer than those countries who used to be in the prosperous civilisations in 1500 before the colonists came, like the Mughals in India and the Incas in the Americas. One explanation offered by the paper focuses on the political institutions of the various colonies: it was less likely for European colonists to introduce economic institutions where they could benefit quickly from the extraction of resources in the area. Therefore, given a more developed civilisation and denser population, European colonists would rather keep the existing economic systems than introduce an entirely new system; while in places with little to extract, European colonists would rather establish new economic institutions to protect their interests. Political institutions thus gave rise to different types of economic systems, which determined the colonial economic performance.

European colonisation and development also changed gendered systems of power already in place around the world. In many pre-colonialist areas, women maintained power, prestige, or authority through reproductive or agricultural control. For example, in certain parts of Sub-Saharan Africa women maintained farmland in which they had usage rights. While men would make political and communal decisions for a community, the women would control the village's food supply or their individual family's land. This allowed women to achieve power and autonomy, even in patrilineal and patriarchal societies.

Through the rise of European colonialism came a large push for development and industrialisation of most economic systems. When working to improve productivity, Europeans focused mostly on male workers. Foreign aid arrived in the form of loans, land, credit, and tools to speed up development, but were only allocated to men. In a more European fashion, women were expected to serve on a more domestic level. The result was a technologic, economic, and class-based gender gap that widened over time.

Within a colony, the presence of extractive colonial institutions in a given area has been found have effects on the modern day economic development, institutions and infrastructure of these areas.

==== On indigenous agricultural flora ====
Colonial botany refers to the body of works concerning the study, cultivation, marketing and naming of the new plants that were acquired or traded during the age of European colonialism. Notable examples of these plants included sugar, nutmeg, tobacco, cloves, cinnamon, Peruvian bark, peppers, Sassafras albidum, and tea. This work was a large part of securing financing for colonial ambitions, supporting European expansion and ensuring the profitability of such endeavors. Vasco de Gama and Christopher Columbus were seeking to establish routes to trade spices, dyes and silk from the Moluccas, India and China by sea that would be independent of the established routes controlled by Venetian and Middle Eastern merchants. Naturalists like Hendrik van Rheede, Georg Eberhard Rumphius, and Jacobus Bontius compiled data about eastern plants on behalf of the Europeans. Though Sweden did not possess an extensive colonial network, botanical research based on Carl Linnaeus identified and developed techniques to grow cinnamon, tea and rice locally as an alternative to costly imports.

=== Slavery and indentured servitude ===
European nations entered their imperial projects with the goal of enriching the European metropoles. Exploitation of non-Europeans and of other Europeans to support imperial goals was acceptable to the colonisers. Two outgrowths of this imperial agenda were the extension of slavery and indentured servitude. In the 17th century, nearly two-thirds of English settlers came to North America as indentured servants.

European slave traders brought large numbers of African slaves to the Americas by sail. Spain and Portugal had brought African slaves to work in African colonies such as Cape Verde and São Tomé and Príncipe, and then in Latin America, by the 16th century. The British, French, and Dutch joined in the slave trade in subsequent centuries. The European colonial system took approximately 11 million Africans to the Caribbean and to North and South America as slaves.

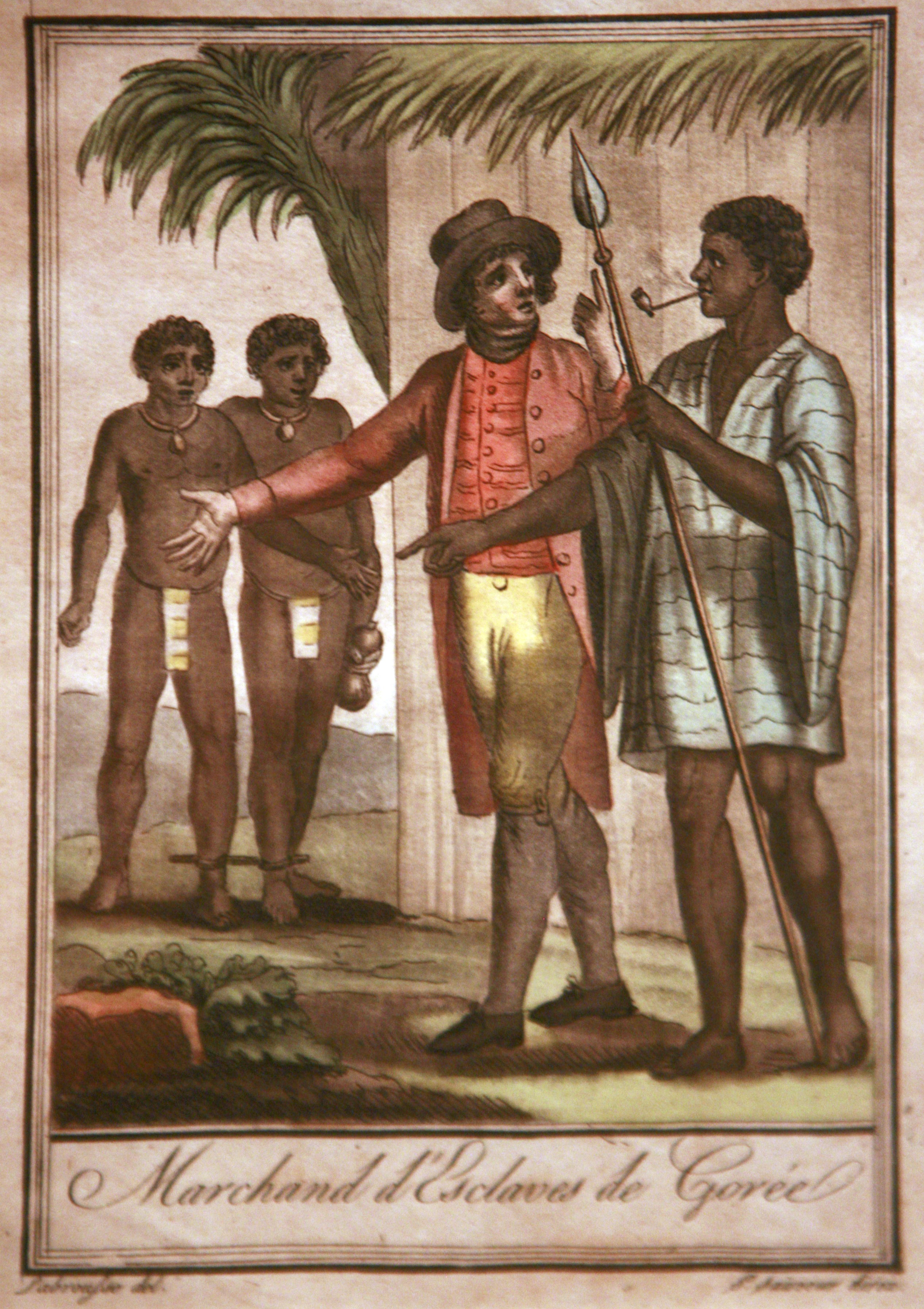
Slave traders in Gorée, Senegal, 18th century

European empire	Colonial destination	Number of slaves imported between 1450 and 1870
Portuguese Empire	Brazil	3,646,800
British Empire	British Caribbean	1,665,000
French Empire	French Caribbean	1,600,200
Spanish Empire	Latin America	1,552,100
Dutch Empire	Dutch Caribbean	500,000
British Empire	British North America	399,000

Abolitionists in Europe and Americas protested the inhumane treatment of African slaves, which led to the elimination of the slave trade (and later, of most forms of slavery) by the late 19th century. One (disputed) school of thought points to the role of abolitionism in the American Revolution: while the British colonial metropole started to move towards outlawing slavery, slave-owning elites in the Thirteen Colonies saw this as one of the reasons to fight for their post-colonial independence and for the right to develop and continue a largely slave-based economy.

British colonising activity in New Zealand from the early 19th century played a part in ending slave-taking and slave-keeping among the indigenous Māori. On the other hand, British colonial administration in Southern Africa, when it officially abolished slavery in the 1830s, caused rifts in society which arguably perpetuated slavery in the Boer Republics and fed into the philosophy of apartheid.

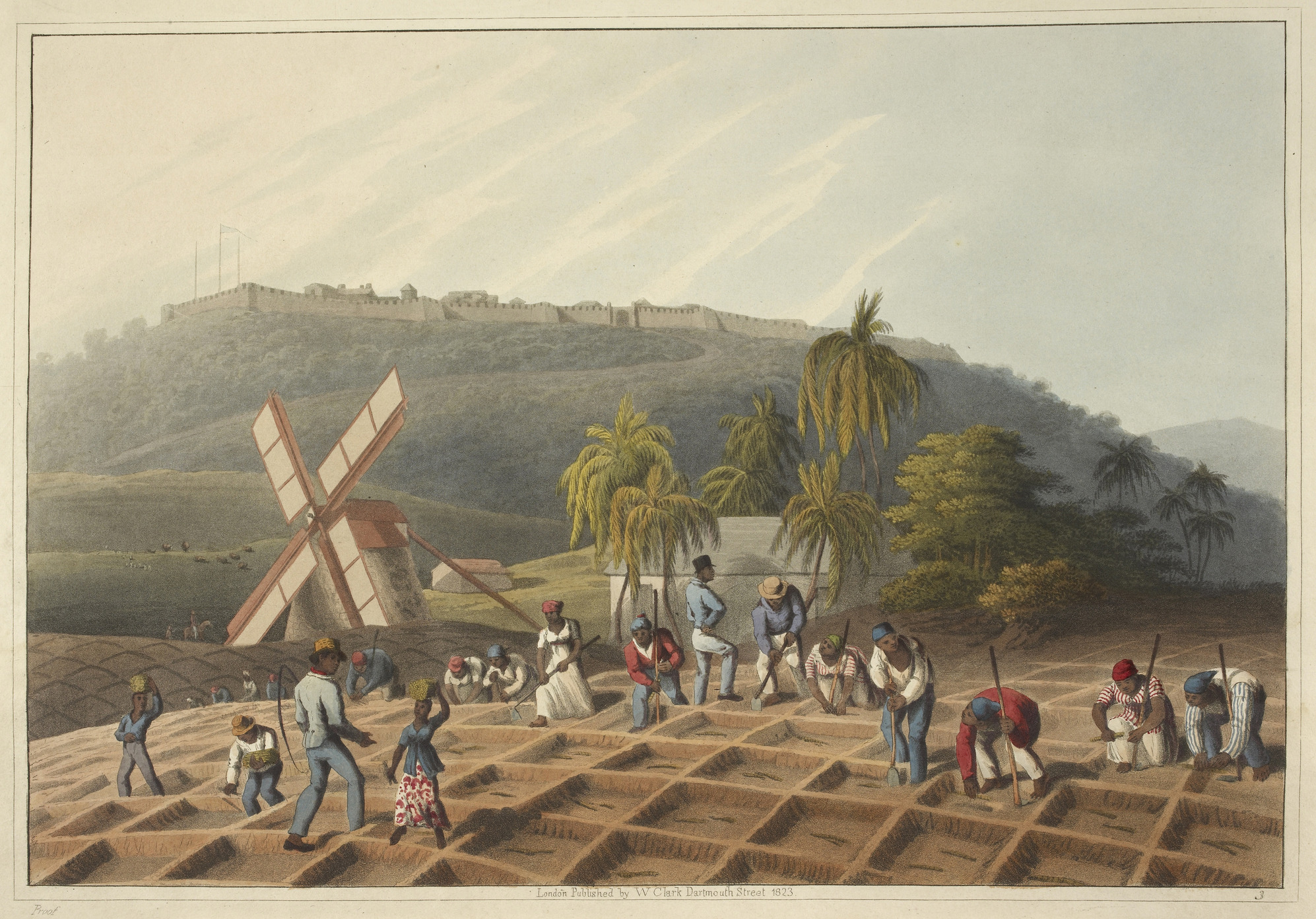
Planting the sugar cane on Bodkin's Estate, Antigua, 1823

The labour shortages that resulted from abolition inspired European colonisers in Queensland, British Guaiana and Fiji (for example) to develop new sources of labour, re-adopting a system of indentured servitude. Indentured servants consented to a contract with the European colonisers. Under their contract, the servant would work for an employer for a term of at least a year, while the employer agreed to pay for the servant's voyage to the colony, possibly pay for the return to the country of origin, and pay the employee a wage as well. The employees became "indentured" to the employer because they owed a debt back to the employer for their travel expense to the colony, which they were expected to pay through their wages. In practice, indentured servants were exploited through terrible working conditions and burdensome debts imposed by the employers, with whom the servants had no means of negotiating the debt once they arrived in the colony.

India and China were the largest source of indentured servants during the colonial era. Indentured servants from India travelled to British colonies in Asia, Africa and the Caribbean, and also to French and Portuguese colonies, while Chinese servants travelled to British and Dutch colonies. Between 1830 and 1930, around 30 million indentured servants migrated from India, and 24 million returned to India. China sent more indentured servants to European colonies, and around the same proportion returned to China.

Following the Scramble for Africa, an early but secondary focus for most colonial regimes was the suppression of slavery and the slave trade. By the end of the colonial period they were mostly successful in this aim, though slavery persists in Africa and in the world at large with much the same practices of de facto servility despite legislative prohibition.

=== Military innovation ===
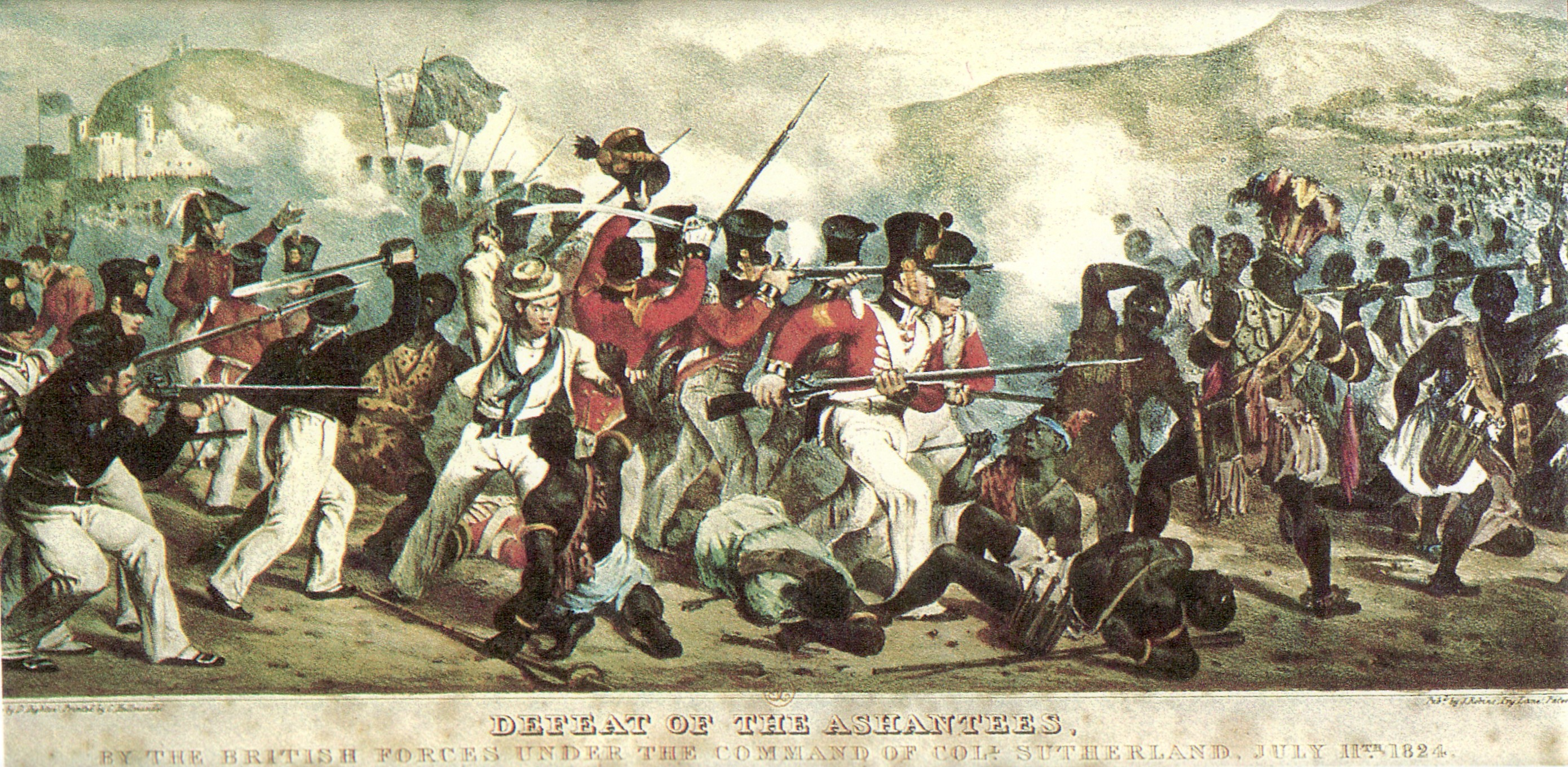
The First Anglo-Ashanti War, 1823–1831

Conquering forces have throughout history applied innovation in order to gain an advantage over the armies of the people they aim to conquer. Greeks developed the phalanx system, which enabled their military units to present themselves to their enemies as a wall, with foot soldiers using shields to cover one another during their advance on the battlefield. Under Philip II of Macedon, they were able to organise thousands of soldiers into a formidable battle force, bringing together carefully trained infantry and cavalry regiments. Alexander the Great exploited this military foundation further during his conquests.

The Spanish Empire held a major advantage over Mesoamerican warriors through the use of weapons made of stronger metal, predominantly iron, which was able to shatter the blades of axes used by the Aztec civilisation and others. The use of gunpowder weapons cemented the European military advantage over the peoples they sought to subjugate in the Americas and elsewhere.

=== Decolonization/independence ===
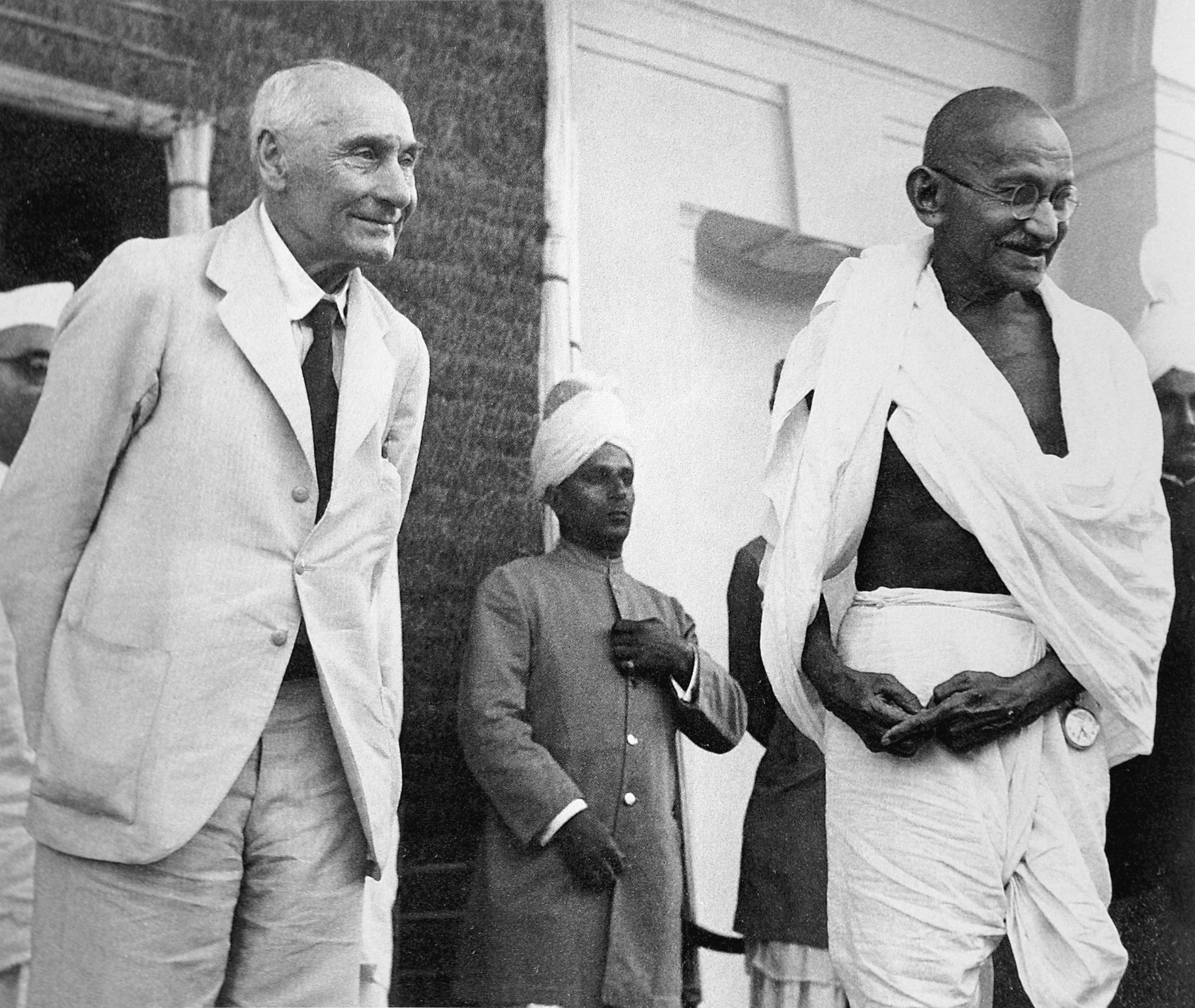
Gandhi with Lord Pethwick-Lawrence, British Secretary of State for India, after a meeting on 18 April 1946

The populations of some colonial territories, such as Canada, enjoyed relative peace and prosperity as part of a European power, at least among the majority. Minority populations such as First Nations peoples and French-Canadians experienced marginalisation and resented colonial practices. Francophone residents of Quebec, for example, were vocal in opposing conscription into the armed services to fight on behalf of Britain during World War I, resulting in the Conscription crisis of 1917. Other European colonies had much more pronounced conflict between European settlers and the local population. Rebellions broke out in the later decades of the imperial era, such as India's Sepoy Rebellion of 1857.

The territorial boundaries imposed by European colonisers, notably in central Africa and South Asia, defied the existing boundaries of native populations that had previously interacted little with one another. European colonisers disregarded native political and cultural animosities, imposing peace upon people under their military control. Native populations were often relocated at the will of the colonial administrators.

The Partition of British India in August 1947 led to the Independence of India and the creation of Pakistan. These events also caused much bloodshed at the time of the migration of immigrants from the two countries. Muslims from India and Hindus and Sikhs from Pakistan migrated to the respective countries they sought independence for.

=== Post-independence population movement ===
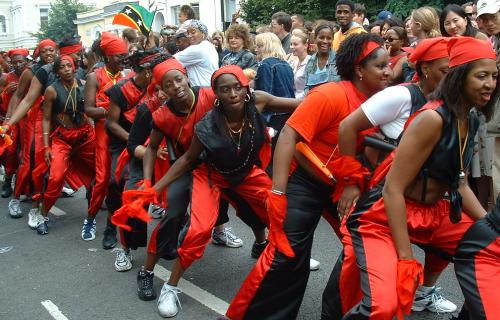
The annual Notting Hill Carnival in London is a celebration led by the Trinidadian and Tobagonian British community.

In a reversal of the migration patterns experienced during the modern colonial era, post-independence era migration followed a route back towards the imperial country. In some cases, this was a movement of settlers of European origin returning to the land of their birth, or to an ancestral birthplace. 900,000 French colonists (known as the Pied-Noirs) resettled in France following Algeria's independence in 1962. A significant number of these migrants were also of Algerian descent. 800,000 people of Portuguese origin migrated to Portugal after the independence of former colonies in Africa between 1974 and 1979; 300,000 settlers of Dutch origin migrated to the Netherlands from the Dutch West Indies after Dutch military control of the colony ended.

After WWII 300,000 Dutchmen from the Dutch East Indies, of which the majority were people of Eurasian descent called Indo Europeans, repatriated to the Netherlands. A significant number later migrated to the US, Canada, Australia and New Zealand.

Global travel and migration in general developed at an increasingly brisk pace throughout the era of European colonial expansion. Citizens of the former colonies of European countries may have a privileged status in some respects with regard to immigration rights when settling in the former European imperial nation. For example, rights to dual citizenship may be generous, or larger immigrant quotas may be extended to former colonies.

In some cases, the former European imperial nations continue to foster close political and economic ties with former colonies. The Commonwealth of Nations is an organisation that promotes cooperation between and among Britain and its former colonies, the Commonwealth members. A similar organisation exists for former colonies of France, the Francophonie; the Community of Portuguese Language Countries plays a similar role for former Portuguese colonies, and the Dutch Language Union is the equivalent for former colonies of the Netherlands.

Migration from former colonies has proven to be problematic for European countries, where the majority population may express hostility to ethnic minorities who have immigrated from former colonies. Cultural and religious conflict have often erupted in France in recent decades, between immigrants from the Maghreb countries of north Africa and the majority population of France. Nonetheless, immigration has changed the ethnic composition of France; by the 1980s, 25% of the total population of "inner Paris" and 14% of the metropolitan region were of foreign origin, mainly Algerian.

=== Introduced diseases ===
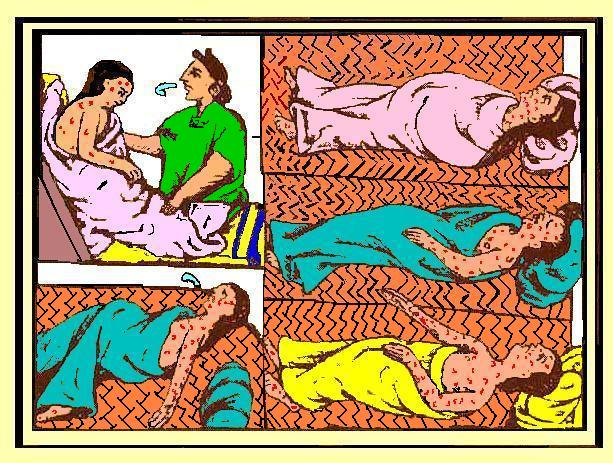
Aztecs dying of smallpox, (Florentine Codex, 1540–1585)

Encounters between explorers and populations in the rest of the world often introduced new diseases, which sometimes caused local epidemics of extraordinary virulence. For example, smallpox, measles, malaria, yellow fever, and others were unknown in pre-Columbian America.

Half the native population of Hispaniola in 1518 was killed by smallpox. Smallpox also ravaged Mexico in the 1520s, killing 150,000 in Tenochtitlan alone, including the emperor, and Peru in the 1530s, aiding the European conquerors. Measles killed a further two million Mexican natives in the 17th century. In 1618–1619, smallpox wiped out 90% of the Massachusetts Bay Native Americans. Smallpox epidemics in 1780–1782 and 1837–1838 brought devastation and drastic depopulation among the Plains Indians. Some believe that the death of up to 95% of the Native American population of the New World was caused by Old World diseases. Over the centuries, the Europeans had developed high degrees of immunity to these diseases, while the indigenous peoples had no time to build such immunity.

Smallpox decimated the native population of Australia, killing around 50% of indigenous Australians in the early years of British colonisation. It also killed many New Zealand Māori. As late as 1848–49, as many as 40,000 out of 150,000 Hawaiians are estimated to have died of measles, whooping cough and influenza. Introduced diseases, notably smallpox, nearly wiped out the native population of Easter Island. In 1875, measles killed over 40,000 Fijians, approximately one-third of the population. The Ainu population decreased drastically in the 19th century, due in large part to infectious diseases brought by Japanese settlers pouring into Hokkaido.

Conversely, researchers have hypothesised that a precursor to syphilis may have been carried from the New World to Europe after Columbus's voyages. The findings suggested Europeans could have carried the nonvenereal tropical bacteria home, where the organisms may have mutated into a more deadly form in the different conditions of Europe. The disease was more frequently fatal than it is today; syphilis was a major killer in Europe during the Renaissance. The first cholera pandemic began in Bengal, then spread across India by 1820. Ten thousand British troops and countless Indians died during this pandemic. Between 1736 and 1834 only some 10% of East India Company's officers survived to take the final voyage home. Waldemar Haffkine, who mainly worked in India, who developed and used vaccines against cholera and bubonic plague in the 1890s, is considered the first microbiologist.

According to a 2021 study by Jörg Baten and Laura Maravall on the anthropometric influence of colonialism on Africans, the average height of Africans decreased by 1.1 centimetres upon colonization and later recovered and increased overall during colonial rule. The authors attributed the decrease to diseases, such as malaria and sleeping sickness, forced labor during the early decades of colonial rule, conflicts, land grabbing, and widespread cattle deaths from the rinderpest viral disease.

==== Countering disease ====
As early as 1803, the Spanish Crown organised a mission (the Balmis expedition) to transport the smallpox vaccine to the Spanish colonies, and establish mass vaccination programs there. By 1832, the federal government of the United States established a smallpox vaccination program for Native Americans. Under the direction of Mountstuart Elphinstone a program was launched to propagate smallpox vaccination in India. From the beginning of the 20th century onwards, the elimination or control of disease in tropical countries became a driving force for all colonial powers. The sleeping sickness epidemic in Africa was arrested due to mobile teams systematically screening millions of people at risk. In the 20th century, the world saw the biggest increase in its population in human history due to lessening of the mortality rate in many countries due to medical advances. According to the UN, the world population has grown from 1.6 billion in 1900 to over eight billion today.

== Geography ==
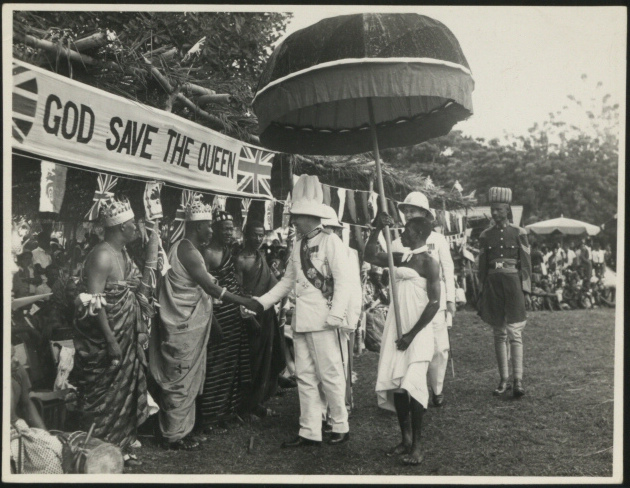
British Togoland in 1953

Settlers acted as the link between indigenous populations and the imperial hegemony, thus bridging the geographical, ideological and commercial gap between the colonisers and colonised. While the extent in which geography as an academic study is implicated in colonialism is contentious, geographical tools such as cartography, shipbuilding, navigation, mining and agricultural productivity were instrumental in European colonial expansion. Colonisers' awareness of the Earth's surface and abundance of practical skills provided colonisers with a knowledge that, in turn, created power.

Anne Godlewska and Neil Smith argue that "empire was 'quintessentially a geographical project'". Historical geographical theories such as environmental determinism legitimised colonialism by positing the view that some parts of the world were underdeveloped, which created notions of skewed evolution. Geographers such as Ellen Churchill Semple and Ellsworth Huntington put forward the notion that northern climates bred vigour and intelligence as opposed to those indigenous to tropical climates (See The Tropics) viz a viz a combination of environmental determinism and Social Darwinism in their approach.

Political geographers also maintain that colonial behaviour was reinforced by the physical mapping of the world, therefore creating a visual separation between "them" and "us". Geographers are primarily focused on the spaces of colonialism and imperialism; more specifically, the material and symbolic appropriation of space enabling colonialism.

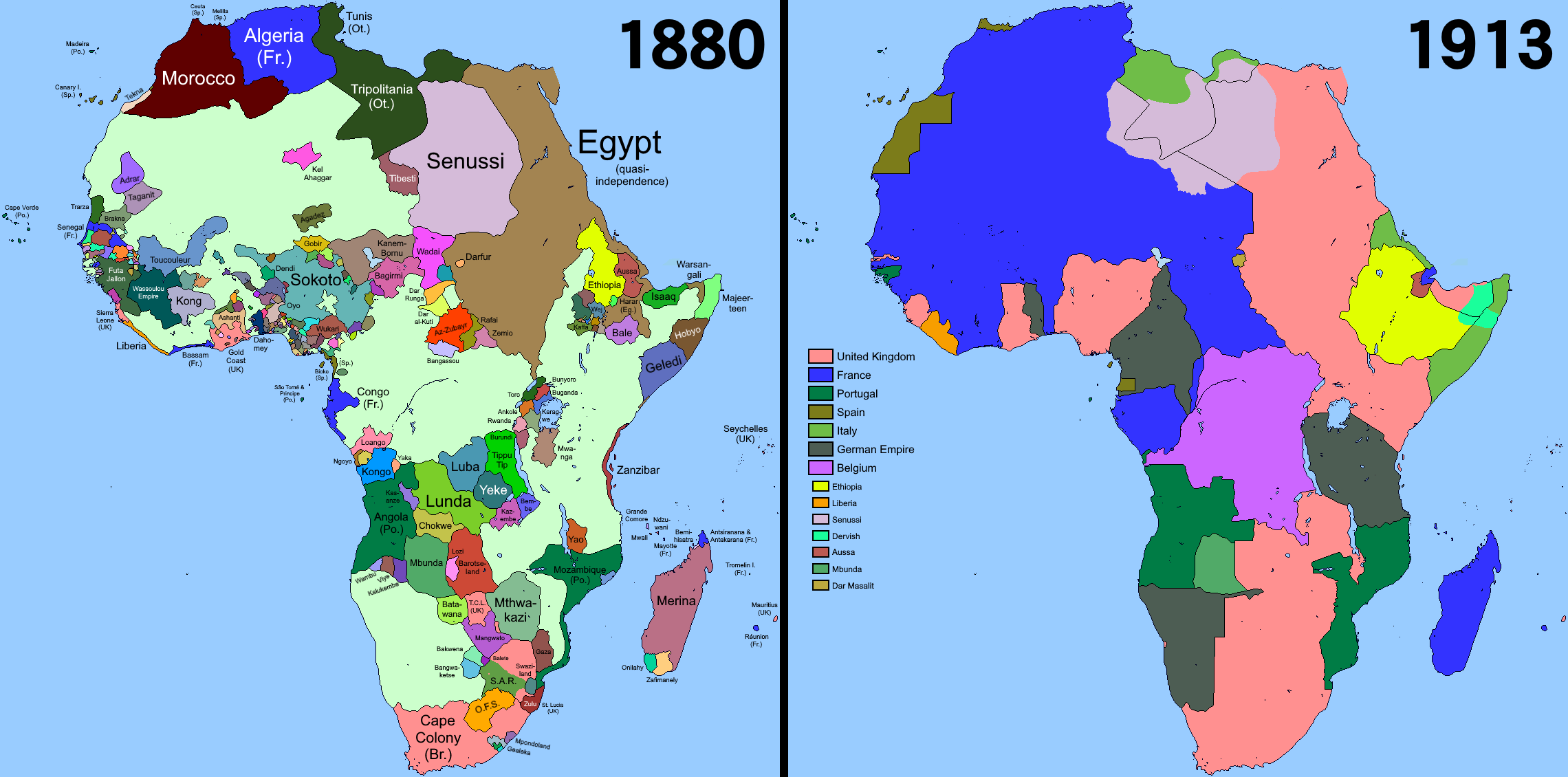
Comparison of Africa in the years 1880 and 1913

Maps played an extensive role in colonialism, as Bassett would put it "by providing geographical information in a convenient and standardised format, cartographers helped open West Africa to European conquest, commerce, and colonisation". Because the relationship between colonialism and geography was not scientifically objective, cartography was often manipulated during the colonial era. Social norms and values had an effect on the constructing of maps. During colonialism map-makers used rhetoric in their formation of boundaries and in their art. The rhetoric favoured the view of the conquering Europeans; this is evident in the fact that any map created by a non-European was instantly regarded as inaccurate. Furthermore, European cartographers were required to follow a set of rules which led to ethnocentrism; portraying one's own ethnicity in the centre of the map. As J.B. Harley put it, "The steps in making a map – selection, omission, simplification, classification, the creation of hierarchies, and 'symbolisation' – are all inherently rhetorical."

A common practice by the European cartographers of the time was to map unexplored areas as "blank spaces". This influenced the colonial powers as it sparked competition amongst them to explore and colonise these regions. Imperialists aggressively and passionately looked forward to filling these spaces for the glory of their respective countries. The Dictionary of Human Geography notes that cartography was used to empty 'undiscovered' lands of their Indigenous meaning and bring them into spatial existence via the imposition of "Western place-names and borders, [therefore] priming 'virgin' (putatively empty land, 'wilderness') for colonisation (thus sexualising colonial landscapes as domains of male penetration), reconfiguring alien space as absolute, quantifiable and separable (as property)."

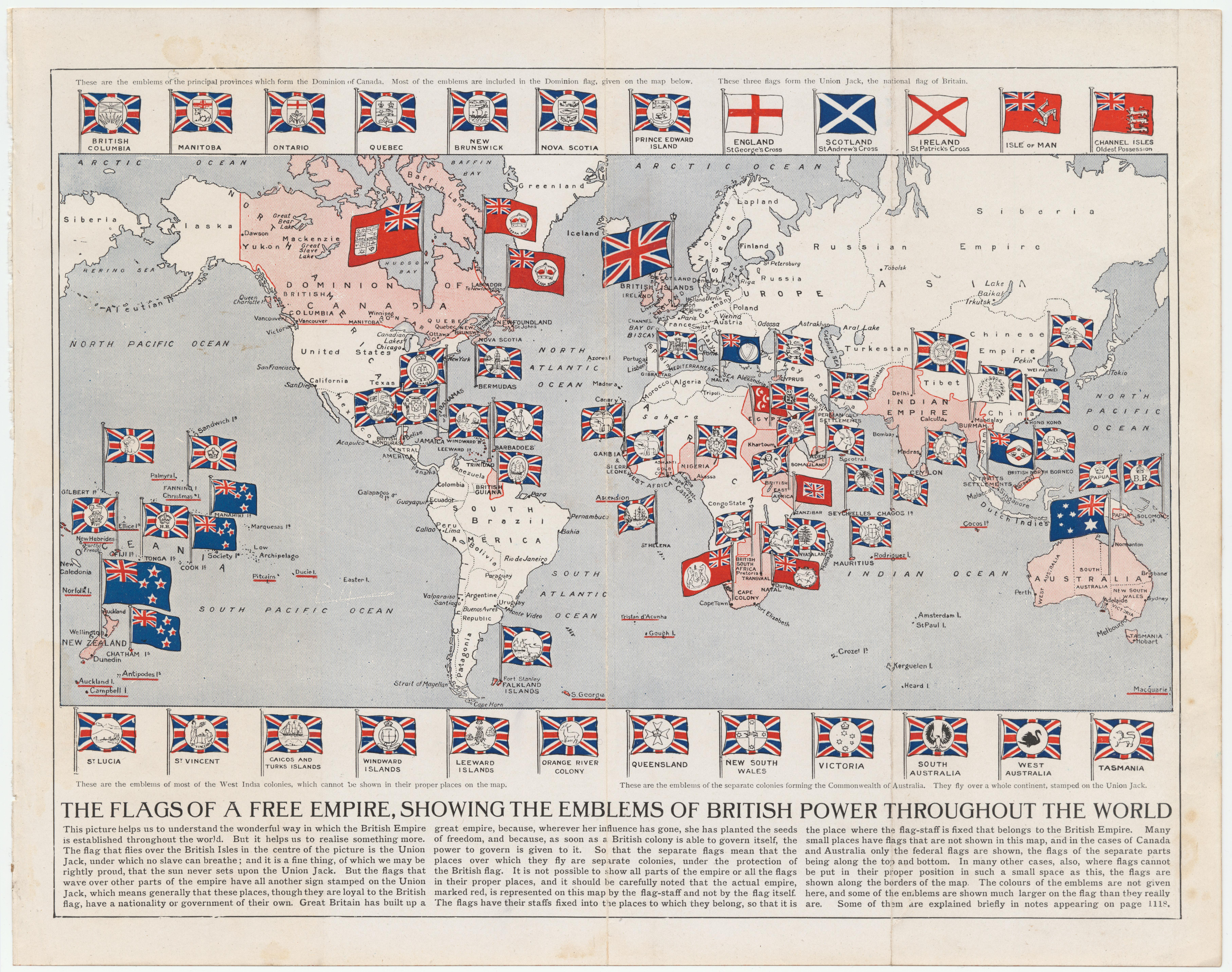
Map of the British Empire (as of 1910). At its height, it was the largest empire in history.

David Livingstone stresses "that geography has meant different things at different times and in different places" and that we should keep an open mind in regards to the relationship between geography and colonialism instead of identifying boundaries. Geography as a discipline was not and is not an objective science, Painter and Jeffrey argue, rather it is based on assumptions about the physical world. Comparison of exogeographical representations of ostensibly tropical environments in science fiction art support this conjecture, finding the notion of the tropics to be an artificial collection of ideas and beliefs that are independent of geography.

=== Ocean and space ===
With contemporary advances in deep sea and outer space technologies, colonization of the seabed and the Moon have become an object of non-terrestrial colonialism.

== Perspectives ==
=== Marxism ===
Marxism views colonialism as a form of capitalism, enforcing exploitation and social change. Marx thought that working within the global capitalist system, colonialism is closely associated with uneven development. It is an "instrument of wholesale destruction, dependency and systematic exploitation producing distorted economies, socio-psychological disorientation, massive poverty and neocolonial dependency". Lenin regarded colonialism as the root cause of imperialism, as imperialism was distinguished by monopoly capitalism via colonialism and as Lyal S. Sunga explains: "Vladimir Lenin advocated forcefully the principle of self-determination of peoples in his "Theses on the Socialist Revolution and the Right of Nations to Self-Determination" as an integral plank in the programme of socialist internationalism" and he quotes Lenin who contended that "The right of nations to self-determination implies exclusively the right to independence in the political sense, the right to free political separation from the oppressor nation. Specifically, this demand for political democracy implies complete freedom to agitate for secession and for a referendum on secession by the seceding nation." Non-Russian Marxists within the RSFSR and later the USSR, like Sultan Galiev and Vasyl Shakhrai, meanwhile, between 1918 and 1923 and then after 1929, considered the Soviet regime a renewed version of Russian imperialism and colonialism.

In his critique of colonialism in Africa, the Guyanese historian and political activist Walter Rodney states:

The decisiveness of the short period of colonialism and its negative consequences for Africa spring mainly from the fact that Africa lost power. Power is the ultimate determinant in human society, being basic to the relations within any group and between groups. It implies the ability to defend one's interests and if necessary to impose one's will by any means available ... When one society finds itself forced to relinquish power entirely to another society that in itself is a form of underdevelopment ... During the centuries of pre-colonial trade, some control over social political and economic life was retained in Africa, in spite of the disadvantageous commerce with Europeans. That little control over internal matters disappeared under colonialism. Colonialism went much further than trade. It meant a tendency towards direct appropriation by Europeans of the social institutions within Africa. Africans ceased to set indigenous cultural goals and standards, and lost full command of training young members of the society. Those were undoubtedly major steps backwards ... Colonialism was not merely a system of exploitation, but one whose essential purpose was to repatriate the profits to the so-called 'mother country'. From an African view-point, that amounted to consistent expatriation of surplus produced by African labour out of African resources. It meant the development of Europe as part of the same dialectical process in which Africa was underdeveloped. Colonial Africa fell within that part of the international capitalist economy from which surplus was drawn to feed the metropolitan sector. As seen earlier, exploitation of land and labour is essential for human social advance, but only on the assumption that the product is made available within the area where the exploitation takes place.

According to Lenin, the new imperialism emphasised the transition of capitalism from free trade to a stage of monopoly capitalism to finance capital. He states it is, "connected with the intensification of the struggle for the partition of the world". As free trade thrives on exports of commodities, monopoly capitalism thrived on the export of capital amassed by profits from banks and industry. This, to Lenin, was the highest stage of capitalism. He goes on to state that this form of capitalism was doomed for war between the capitalists and the exploited nations with the former inevitably losing. War is stated to be the consequence of imperialism. As a continuation of this thought, G.N. Uzoigwe states, "But it is now clear from more serious investigations of African history in this period that imperialism was essentially economic in its fundamental impulses."

=== Liberalism and capitalism ===
Classical liberals were generally in abstract opposition to colonialism and imperialism, including Adam Smith, Frédéric Bastiat, Richard Cobden, John Bright, Henry Richard, Herbert Spencer, H.R. Fox Bourne, Edward Morel, Josephine Butler, W.J. Fox and William Ewart Gladstone. Their philosophies found the colonial enterprise, particularly mercantilism, in opposition to the principles of free trade and liberal policies. Adam Smith wrote in The Wealth of Nations that Britain should grant independence to all of its colonies and also argued that it would be economically beneficial for British people in the average, although the merchants having mercantilist privileges would lose out.

=== Race and gender ===
During the colonial era, the global process of colonisation served to spread and synthesize the social and political belief systems of the "mother-countries" which often included a belief in a certain natural racial superiority of the race of the mother-country. Colonialism also acted to reinforce these same racial belief systems within the "mother-countries" themselves. Usually also included within the colonial belief systems was a certain belief in the inherent superiority of male over female. This particular belief was often pre-existing amongst the pre-colonial societies, prior to their colonisation.

Popular political practices of the time reinforced colonial rule by legitimising European (and/ or Japanese) male authority, and also legitimising female and non-mother-country race inferiority through studies of craniology, comparative anatomy, and phrenology. Biologists, naturalists, anthropologists, and ethnologists of the 19th century were focused on the study of colonised indigenous women, as in the case of Georges Cuvier's study of Sarah Baartman. Such cases embraced a natural superiority and inferiority relationship between the races based on the observations of naturalists' from the mother-countries. European studies along these lines gave rise to the perception that African women's anatomy, and especially genitalia, resembled those of mandrills, baboons, and monkeys, thus differentiating colonised Africans from what were viewed as the features of the evolutionarily superior, and thus rightfully authoritarian, European woman.

In addition to what would now be viewed as pseudo-scientific studies of race, which tended to reinforce a belief in an inherent mother-country racial superiority, a new supposedly "science-based" ideology concerning gender roles also then emerged as an adjunct to the general body of beliefs of inherent superiority of the colonial era. Female inferiority across all cultures was emerging as an idea supposedly supported by craniology that led scientists to argue that the typical brain size of the female human was, on the average, slightly smaller than that of the male, thus inferring that therefore female humans must be less developed and less evolutionarily advanced than males. This finding of relative cranial size difference was later attributed to the general typical size difference of the human male body versus that of the typical human female body.

Within the former European colonies, non-Europeans and women sometimes faced invasive studies by the colonial powers in the interest of the then prevailing pro-colonial scientific ideology of the day.

==== Othering ====
Othering is the process of creating a separate entity to persons or groups who are labelled as different or non-normal due to the repetition of characteristics. Othering is the creation of those who discriminate, to distinguish, label, categorise those who do not fit in the societal norm. Several scholars in recent decades developed the notion of the "other" as an epistemological concept in social theory. For example, postcolonial scholars, believed that colonising powers explained an "other" who were there to dominate, civilise, and extract resources through colonisation of land.

Political geographers explain how colonial/imperial powers "othered" places they wanted to dominate to legalise their exploitation of the land. During and after the rise of colonialism the Western powers perceived the East as the "other", being different and separate from their societal norm. This viewpoint and separation of culture had divided the Eastern and Western culture creating a dominant/subordinate dynamic, both being the "other" towards themselves.

=== Post-colonialism ===
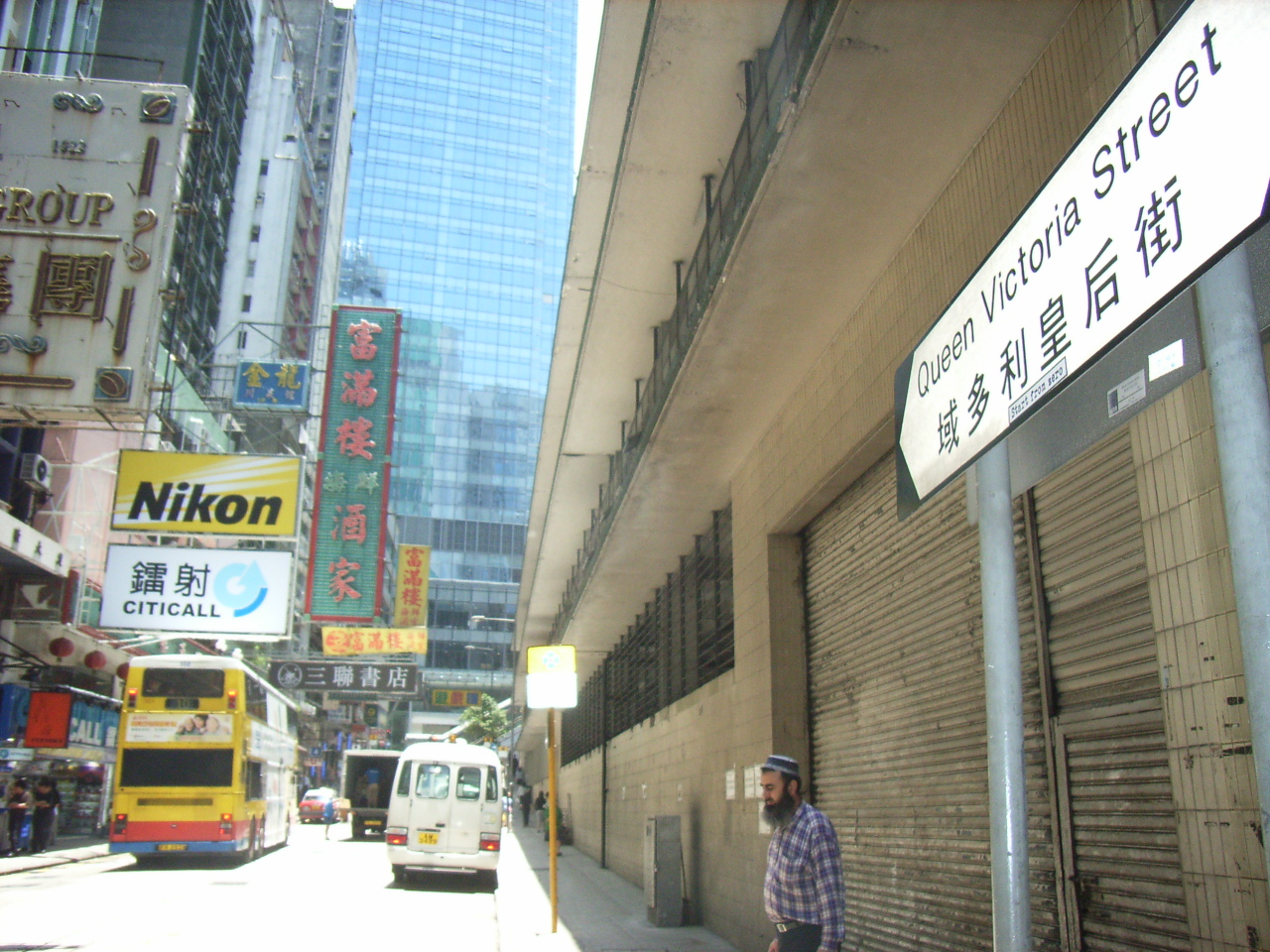
Queen Victoria Street in the former British colony of Hong Kong

Post-colonialism (or post-colonial theory) can refer to a set of theories in philosophy and literature that grapple with the legacy of colonial rule. In this sense, one can regard post-colonial literature as a branch of postmodern literature concerned with the political and cultural independence of peoples formerly subjugated in colonial empires.

Many practitioners take Edward Saïd's book Orientalism (1978) as the theory's founding work (although French theorists such as Aimé Césaire (1913–2008) and Frantz Fanon (1925–1961) made similar claims decades before Saïd). Saïd analyzed the works of Balzac, Baudelaire and Lautréamont, arguing that they helped to shape a societal fantasy of European racial superiority.

Writers of post-colonial fiction interact with the traditional colonial discourse, but modify or subvert it; for instance by retelling a familiar story from the perspective of an oppressed minor character in the story. Gayatri Chakravorty Spivak's Can the Subaltern Speak? (1998) gave its name to Subaltern Studies.

In A Critique of Postcolonial Reason (1999), Spivak argued that major works of European metaphysics (such as those of Kant and Hegel) not only tend to exclude the subaltern from their discussions, but actively prevent non-Europeans from occupying positions as fully human subjects. Hegel's Phenomenology of Spirit (1807), famous for its explicit ethnocentrism, considers Western civilisation as the most accomplished of all, while Kant also had some traces of racialism in his work.

The 2014 YouGov survey found that British people are mostly proud of colonialism and the British Empire:

A new YouGov survey finds that most think the British Empire is more something to be proud of (59%) than to be ashamed of (19%). 23% don't know. Young people are least likely to feel pride over shame when it comes to the Empire, though about half (48%) of 18–24 year olds do. In comparison, about two-thirds (65%) of over 60s feel mostly proud. ... A third of British people (34%) also say they would like it if Britain still had an empire. Under half (45%) say they would not like the Empire to exist today. 20% don't know.

== See also ==
- African independence movements
- Age of Discovery
- Anti-imperialism
- Chartered company
- Chinese imperialism
- Christianity and colonialism
- Civilising mission
- Client state
- Colonial Empire
- Colonialism in Switzerland
- Colonialism and the Olympic Games
- Coloniality of power
- Colonial war
- Cultural colonialism
- Decoloniality
- Decolonization of the Americas
- Developmentalism
- Direct colonial rule
- Empire of Liberty
- European colonization of Africa
- European colonization of the Americas
- European colonization of Micronesia
- European colonisation of Southeast Asia
- French law on colonialism
- German eastward expansion
- Global Empire
- Historiography of the British Empire
- Impact of Western European colonialism and colonisation
- International relations of the Great Powers (1814–1919)
- Orientalism
- Pluricontinental
- Protectorate
- Right of conquest
- Satellite state
- Stranger King (Concept)
- Western imperialism in Asia

== Sources ==
- Aaronson, Ran (1996). "Settlement in Eretz Israel – A Colonialist Enterprise? "Critical" Scholarship and Historical Geography". Israel Studies. 1 (2). Indiana University Press: 214–229. Archived from the original on 21 December 2013.
- Alroey, Gur (Fall 2011). ""Zionism without Zion"? Territorialist Ideology and the Zionist Movement, 1882–1956". Jewish Social Studies. 18 (1): 1–32. doi:10.2979/jewisocistud.18.1.1. JSTOR 10.2979/jewisocistud.18.1.1.
- Bloom, Etan (2011). Arthur Ruppin and the Production of Pre-Israeli Culture. Brill. ISBN 978-90-04-20379-2.
- Cohen, Michael J. (2011). "Zionism and British imperialism II: Imperial financing in Palestine". Journal of Israeli History: Politics, Society, Culture. 30 (2): 115–139. doi:10.1080/13531042.2011.610119.
- Collins, John (2011). "A Dream Deterred: Palestine from Total War to Total Peace". In Bateman, Fiona (ed.). Studies in Settler Colonialism: Politics, Identity and Culture. London: Palgrave Macmillan UK. pp. 169–185. doi:10.1057/9780230306288_12. ISBN 978-0-230-30628-8.
- Jabotinsky, Ze'ev (4 November 1923). "The Iron Wall" (PDF). Archived (PDF) from the original on 9 May 2024.
- Murphy, Emma C. (2005). "Zionism and the Palestine Question". A Companion to the History of the Middle East. John Wiley & Sons. pp. 269–290. doi:10.1002/9780470996423.ch15. ISBN 978-0-470-99642-3.
- Robinson, Shira (2013). Citizen Strangers: Palestinians and the Birth of Israel's Liberal Settler State. Stanford University Press. ISBN 978-0-804-78802-1.
- Yadgar, Yaacov (2017). Sovereign Jews. State University of New York Press. doi:10.1515/9781438465357-008. ISBN 978-1-4384-6535-7.
