= Persistence studies =

Persistence studies is scholarship in the social sciences that links, usually through quantitative causal inference, historical events with later political, economic and social outcomes. It is particularly prevalent in economics, economic history, political science, and sociology. The scholarship emerged in the early 2000s. Early landmark studies include two studies by economists Daron Acemoglu, Simon Johnson, and James Robinson in 2001 and 2002 that linked colonial institutions to variations in contemporary economic outcomes.

== Methodology ==
=== Framework ===
According to Alexandra Cirone and Thomas Pepinsky, there are typically five steps in persistence scholarship:

1. "Define and measure a causal variable of interest."
2. "Characterize its assignment mechanism."
3. "Define and measure a relevant outcome variable."
4. "Estimate the effect of the causal variable on the outcome variable using a research design that is appropriate given the proposed assignment mechanism."
5. "Characterize the causal mechanisms that link the causal variable and the outcome."

=== Process ===
According to Nathan Nunn, persistence studies usually take the following form,

[Scholars] begin by collecting new data, often from archival sources, that measure aspects of the historical episode of interest. These data are then connected to contemporary outcomes of interest, matched through populations, societies, or locations, to test whether the historical factor has a causal effect on the contemporary factors being examined. Statistical analysis is undertaken, studying variation across individuals, ethnicities, or countries and using empirical techniques (such as instrumental variables, regression discontinuity, difference-in-difference, or natural experiments) that are aimed at distinguishing causal relationships from mere correlation. Having established the importance of a historical factor or episode for outcomes today, an attempt is then made to understand the exact causal mechanisms that account for the observed relationship. This generally requires the collection of additional data and additional statistical analysis, as well as an integration of the historical literature and descriptive evidence.

What distinguishes persistence research from broader comparative research on historical legacies is the use of precise causal inference methods.

== Criticism ==
Critics of persistence studies argue the pitfalls of the approach lie in a failure to recognize institutional change ("anti-persistence"), vague mechanisms, the insufficient use (or misuse) of historical sources and narratives, the compression of history, and a failure to account for the effects of geography." A 2024 review of 30 prominent persistence studies articles in leading journals found that after correcting the standard errors, few of the results approach statistical significance at conventional levels. A 2025 study of the persistence literature on Africa found that some of the prominent findings in the literature did not replicate.

More recent scholarship has responded to the "anti-persistence" critique by theorizing and testing the conditions under which historical legacies weaken or disappear. A 2026 study of Ottoman-era corruption legacies in Romania's healthcare sector found that the COVID-19 pandemic significantly attenuated the legacy's effect, arguing that crises can disrupt persistence when they alter the behaviours through which a legacy is reproduced.

More specifically, the paper argues that

The effectiveness of a crisis in dismantling a legacy ultimately depends on its alignment with the specific behavioral and institutional configurations set in motion by the original critical juncture. If a crisis collides directly with the core practices of a legacy, be they entrenched hierarchies, social norms or networks of reciprocal obligations, it can rapidly erode or even uproot them. Conversely, if the crisis unfolds outside this sphere, its impact on the legacy may be muted or negligible.
