= Causal AI =

Development of artificial intelligence

Causal AI is a technique in artificial intelligence that builds a causal model and can thereby make inferences using causality rather than just correlation. One practical use for causal AI is for organisations to explain decision-making and the causes for a decision.

Systems based on causal AI, by identifying the underlying web of causality for a behaviour or event, provide insights that solely predictive AI models might fail to extract from historical data. An analysis of causality may be used to supplement human decisions in situations where understanding the causes behind an outcome is necessary, such as quantifying the impact of different interventions, policy decisions or performing scenario planning. A 2024 paper from Google DeepMind demonstrated mathematically that "Any agent capable of adapting to a sufficiently large set of distributional shifts must have learned a causal model". The paper offers the interpretation that learning to generalise beyond the original training set requires learning a causal model, concluding that causal AI is necessary for artificial general intelligence.

== History ==
The concept of causal AI and the limits of machine learning were raised by Judea Pearl, the Turing Award-winning computer scientist and philosopher, in 2018's The Book of Why: The New Science of Cause and Effect. Pearl asserted: “Machines' lack of understanding of causal relations is perhaps the biggest roadblock to giving them human-level intelligence.”

In 2020, Columbia University established a Causal AI Lab under Director Elias Bareinboim. Professor Bareinboim's research focuses on causal and counterfactual inference and their applications to data-driven fields in the health and social sciences as well as artificial intelligence and machine learning. Technological research and consulting firm Gartner for the first time included causal AI in its 2022 Hype Cycle report, citing it as one of five critical technologies in accelerated AI automation.

Causal AI is closely related to but distinct from fields such as causal inference, explainable AI and causal reasoning. While causal inference focuses on estimating cause-effect relationships (often from observational data), causal AI emphasises the integration of those causal models into AI systems for prediction, planning and adaptation.
