= A3 problem solving =

Structured problem improvement approach

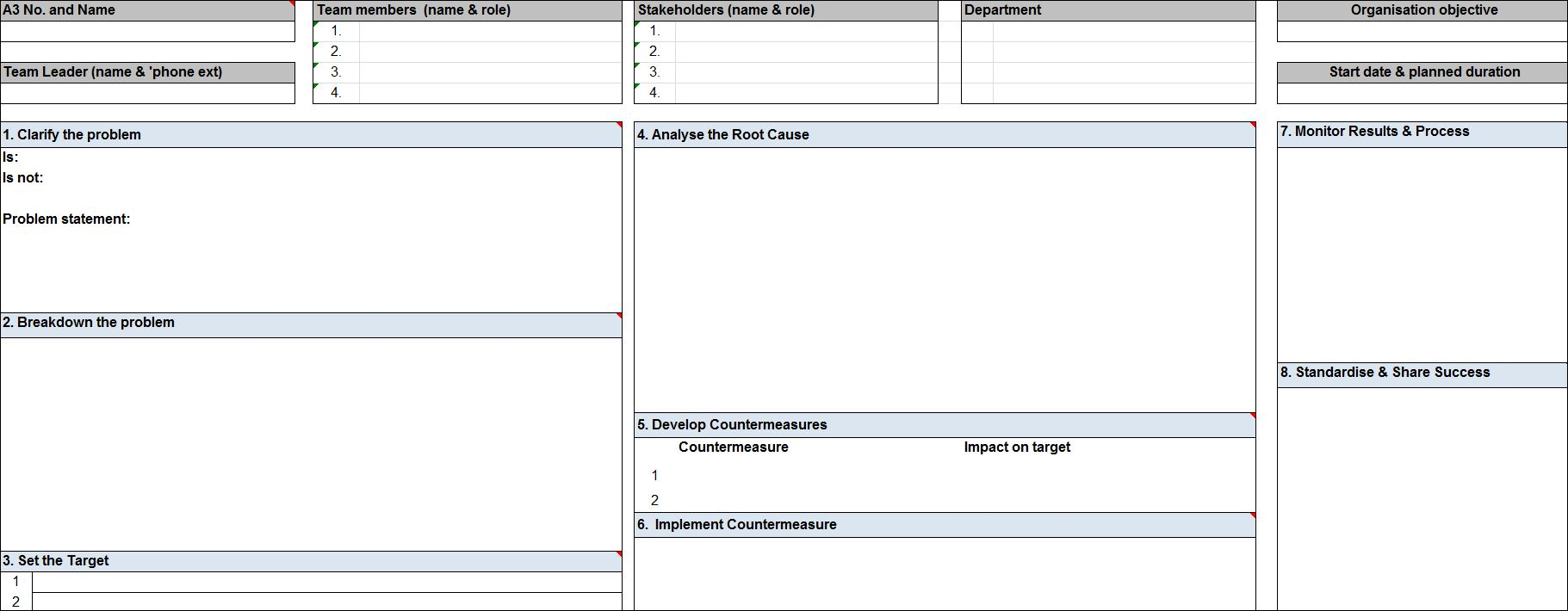
Example of a worksheet for structured problem solving and continuous improvement

A3 problem solving is a structured problem-solving and continuous-improvement approach, first employed at Toyota and typically used by lean manufacturing practitioners. It provides a simple and strict procedure that guides problem solving by workers. The approach typically uses a single sheet of ISO A3-size paper, which is the source of its name. More contemporary versions include the Systems-oriented A3 (or S-A3)

== See also ==
- Analytical quality control – Ensuring accuracy of analytical measurements
- Corrective and preventative action (CAPA) – Improvements in an organization to eliminate non-conformities or undesirable situations
- Eight Disciplines Problem Solving – Eight disciplines of team-oriented problem solving method
- First article inspection (FAI) – Design verification process
- Ishikawa diagram – Causal diagrams created by Kaoru Ishikawa
- Plan–do–check–act – Iterative design and management method
- Problem solving § Problem-solving methods
- Root cause analysis – Method of identifying the fundamental causes of faults or problems
- Quality assurance – Ways of ensuring the quality of a service or product
- Quality management framework – Business process to aid consistent product fitness
- Value stream mapping – Lean-management method for analyzing the current state and designing a future state
