= Proximate and ultimate causation =

Event that is closest to, or immediately responsible for causing, some observed result

Why–because graph of the capsizing of the Herald of Free Enterprise (click to see in detail).

A proximate cause is an event which is closer to (more immediately responsible for) causing some observed result. This exists in contrast to a higher-level ultimate (or distal) cause, which acts less directly through the proximate cause. In formal causal inference, the proximate cause is called a mediator.

- Example: Why did the ship sink?
  - Proximate cause: Because it was holed beneath the waterline, water entered the hull and the ship became denser than the water which supported it, so it could not stay afloat.
  - Ultimate cause: Because the ship hit a rock which tore open the hole in the ship's hull.

In most situations, an ultimate cause may itself be a proximate cause in comparison to a further ultimate cause. Hence we can continue the above example as follows:

- Example: Why did the ship hit the rock?
  - Proximate cause: Because the ship failed to change course to avoid it.
  - Ultimate cause: Because the ship was under autopilot and the autopilot's data was inaccurate.
  - (even stronger): Because the shipwrights made mistakes in the ship's construction.
  - (stronger yet): Because the scheduling of labor at the shipyard allows for very little rest.
  - (in absurdum): Because the shipyard's owners have very small profit margins in an ever-shrinking market.

== In biology ==
The concepts of proximate and ultimate causation in biology were popularised by the German-American evolutionary biologist Ernst Mayr in a 1961 paper entitled 'Cause and Effect in Biology'. Mayr sought to distinguish between causation as understood in evolutionary biology (ultimate causation) and causation as understood in functional biology (proximate causation).

- Ultimate causation explains traits in terms of evolutionary forces acting on them. Mayr described this model of causation as seeking to answer the question, "why?"

Example: female animals often display preferences among male display traits, such as song. An ultimate explanation based on sexual selection states that females who display preferences have more vigorous or more attractive male offspring.

- Proximate causation explains biological function in terms of immediate physiological or environmental factors. Mayr described this model of causation as seeking to answer the question, "how?"

Example: a female animal chooses to mate with a particular male during a mate choice trial. A possible proximate explanation states that one male produced a more intense signal, leading to elevated hormone levels in the female producing copulatory behaviour.

Although the behavior in these two examples is the same, the explanations are based on different sets of factors incorporating evolutionary versus physiological factors.

These can be further divided, for example proximate causes may be given in terms of local muscle movements or in terms of developmental biology (see Tinbergen's four questions).

Mayr believed that proximate and evolutionary causation were complementary and that both needed to be studied to properly explain any given biological phenomenon.

== In philosophy ==
In analytic philosophy, notions of cause adequacy are employed in the causal model. In order to explain the genuine cause of an effect, one would have to satisfy adequacy conditions, which include, among others, the ability to distinguish between:

1. Genuine causal relationships and accidents.
2. Causes and effects.
3. Causes and effects from a common cause.

One famous example of the importance of this is the Duhem–Quine thesis, which demonstrates that it is impossible to test a hypothesis in isolation, because an empirical test of the hypothesis requires one or more background assumptions. One way to solve this issue is to employ contrastive explanations. Several philosophers of science, such as Lipton, argue that contrastive explanations are able to detect genuine causes. An example of a contrastive explanation is a cohort study that includes a control group, where one can determine the cause from observing two otherwise identical samples. This view also circumvents the problem of infinite regression of "why" questions that proximate causes create.

== In sociology ==
Sociologists use the related pair of terms "proximal causation" and "distal causation".

Proximal causation: explanation of human social behaviour by considering the immediate factors, such as symbolic interaction, understanding (Verstehen), and individual milieu that influence that behaviour. Most sociologists recognize that proximal causality is the first type of power humans experience; however, while factors such as family relationships may initially be meaningful, they are not as permanent, underlying, or determining as other factors such as institutions and social networks (Naiman 2008: 5).

Distal causation: explanation of human social behaviour by considering the larger context in which individuals carry out their actions. Proponents of the distal view of power argue that power operates at a more abstract level in the society as a whole (e.g. between economic classes) and that "all of us are affected by both types of power throughout our lives" (ibid). Thus, while individuals occupy roles and statuses relative to each other, it is the social structure and institutions in which these exist that are the ultimate cause of behaviour. A human biography can only be told in relation to the social structure, yet it also must be told in relation to unique individual experiences in order to reveal the complete picture (Mills 1959).

== See also ==
- Abductive reasoning
- Causality
- Causal model
- Cause/Manner of death
- Five whys
- Four causes
- Occam's razor
- Pathology
- Teleology
- Psychological distance
