= R v Motomane =

South African legal case

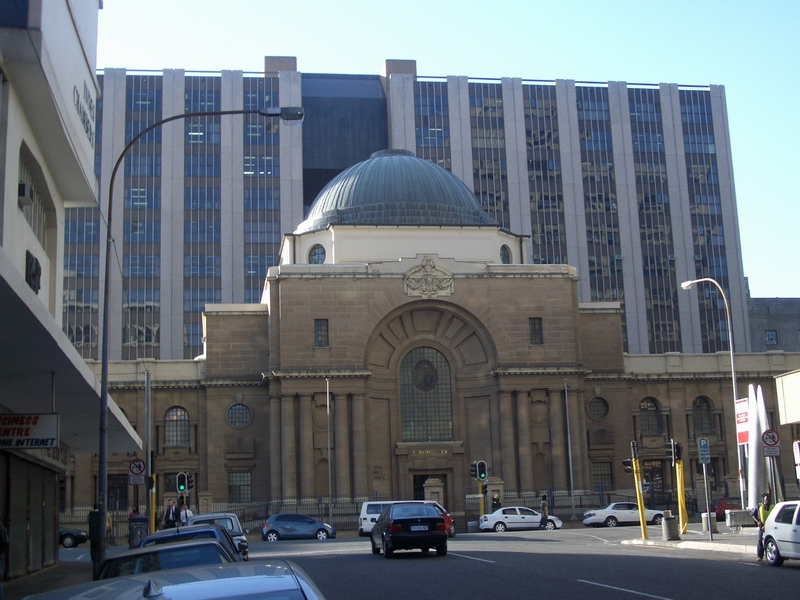
- Court: Witwatersrand Local Division
- Full case name: R v Motomane
- Decided: 6 February 1961
- Citation: 1961 (4) SA 569 (W)

Court membership
- Judge sitting: Ludorf J

Case opinions
- Decision by: Ludorf J

Keywords
- Criminal law, Murder, Cause of death, Novus actus interveniens, Onus

R v Motomane, is an important case in South African criminal law, heard on February 3, 1961, with significance especially for the question of the novus actus interveniens.

== Facts ==
The accused, charged with murder, had knifed a woman, thereby injuring a vein. The bleeding stopped, but a clot formed. The woman would probably have recovered in the ordinary course, but this course was interrupted when a medical practitioner decided to operate: a prudent decision but not a necessary one. The clot was disturbed during the operation; the woman haemorrhaged and bled to death.

== Judgment ==
The court held that the burden of proof was upon the accused to show, on the probabilities, that there was an interruption of the causal chain. The court held that the causal chain had been broken, and that the Crown had failed to prove that the accused was responsible for the death of the deceased. The accused was instead convicted of assault with intent to do grievous bodily harm.

== Criticism ==
The influential academic CR Snyman disapproves of this judgment, preferring that in S v Mabole.
