= R v Du Plessis =

South African legal case

In Rex v Du Plessis, an important case in South African criminal law, considered by the full court of the Transvaal Provincial Division.

The deceased had sustained a rib injury and was then taken to hospital. Pneumonia developed and caused death. A reference in the report to an open window does not appear to have been relevant to the case. It was suggested on the evidence that the open window had been the cause of the pneumonia, but the court found that it was the broken ribs, causing difficulty in breathing, which had caused the pneumonia. The court determined, accordingly, that the causal chain was complete.
