= Causal notation =

Notation to express cause and effect

Causal notation is notation used to express cause and effect.

In nature and human societies, many phenomena have causal relationships where one phenomenon A (a cause) impacts another phenomenon B (an effect). Establishing causal relationships is the aim of many scientific studies across fields ranging from biology and physics to social sciences and economics. It is also a subject of accident analysis, and can be considered a prerequisite for effective policy making.

To describe causal relationships between phenomena, non-quantitative visual notations are common, such as arrows, e.g. in the nitrogen cycle or many chemistry and mathematics textbooks. Mathematical conventions are also used, such as plotting an independent variable on a horizontal axis and a dependent variable on a vertical axis, or the notation $y=f(x)$ to denote that a quantity "$y$" is a dependent variable which is a function of an independent variable "$x$". Causal relationships are also described using quantitative mathematical expressions, which can be linear or nonlinear, and can be visualized (See Notations section.)

The following examples illustrate various types of causal relationships. These are followed by different notations used to represent causal relationships.

== Examples ==
What follows does not necessarily assume the convention whereby $y$ denotes an independent variable, and $f(y)$ denotes a function of the independent variable $y$. Instead, $y$ and $f(y)$ denote two quantities with an a priori unknown causal relationship, which can be related by a mathematical expression.

=== Ecosystem example: correlation without causation ===
Imagine the number of days of weather below one degrees Celsius, $y$, causes ice to form on a lake, $f(y)$, and it causes bears to go into hibernation $g(y)$. Even though $g(y)$ does not cause $f(y)$ and vice versa, one can write an equation relating $g(y)$ and $f(y)$. This equation may be used to successfully calculate the number of hibernating bears $g(y)$, given the surface area of the lake covered by ice. However, melting the ice in a region of the lake by pouring salt onto it, will not cause bears to come out of hibernation. Nor will waking the bears by physically disturbing them cause the ice to melt. In this case the two quantities $f(y)$ and $g(y)$ are both caused by a confounding variable $y$ (the outdoor temperature), but not by each other. $f(y)$ and $g(y)$ are related by correlation without causation.

=== Physics example: a unidirectional causal relationship ===
Suppose an ideal solar-powered system is built such that if it is sunny and the sun provides an intensity $I$ of $100$ watts incident on a $1$m$^2$ solar panel for $10~$ seconds, an electric motor raises a $2$kg stone by $50$ meters, $h(I)$. More generally, we assume the system is described by the following expression:

$I \times A \times t = m \times g \times h ~$,

where $I$ represents intensity of sunlight (J$\cdot$s$^{-1}$$\cdot$m$^{-2}$), $A$ is the surface area of the solar panel (m$^{2}$), $t$ represents time (s), $m$ represents mass (kg), $g$ represents the acceleration due to Earth's gravity ($9.8$ m$\cdot$s$^{-2}$), and $h$ represents the height the rock is lifted (m).

In this example, the fact that it is sunny and there is a light intensity $I$, causes the stone to rise $h(I)$, not the other way around; lifting the stone (increasing $h(I)$) will not result in turning on the sun to illuminate the solar panel (an increase in $I$). The causal relationship between $I$ and $h(I)$ is unidirectional.

=== Medicine example: two causes for a single outcome ===
Smoking, $f(y)$, and exposure to asbestos, $g(y)$, are both known causes of cancer, $y$. One can write an equation $f(y) = g(y)$ to describe an equivalent carcinogenicity between how many cigarettes a person smokes, $f(y)$, and how many grams of asbestos a person inhales, $g(y)$. Here, neither $f(y)$ causes $g(y)$ nor $g(y)$ causes $f(y)$, but they both have a common outcome.

=== Bartering example: a bidirectional causal relationship ===
Consider a barter-based economy where the number of cows $C$ one owns has value measured in a standard currency of chickens, $y$. Additionally, the number of barrels of oil $B$ one owns has value which can be measured in chickens, $y$. If a marketplace exists where cows can be traded for chickens which can in turn be traded for barrels of oil, one can write an equation $C(y) = B(y)$ to describe the value relationship between cows $C$ and barrels of oil $B$. Suppose an individual in this economy always keeps half of their value in the form of cows and the other half in the form of barrels of oil. Then, increasing their number of cows $C(y)$ by offering them 4 cows, will eventually lead to an increase in their number of barrels of oil $B(y)$, or vice versa. In this case, the mathematical equality $C(y) = B(y)$ describes a bidirectional causal relationship.

== Notations ==
=== Chemical reactions ===
In chemistry, many chemical reactions are reversible and described using equations which tend towards a dynamic chemical equilibrium. In these reactions, adding a reactant or a product causes the reaction to occur producing more product, or more reactant, respectively. It is standard to draw “harpoon-type” arrows in place of an equals sign, ⇌, to denote the reversible nature of the reaction and the dynamic causal relationship between reactants and products.

=== Statistics: Do notation ===
Do-calculus, and specifically the do operator, is used to describe causal relationships in the language of probability. A notation used in do-calculus is, for instance:

$$P(Y|do(X)) = P(Y)~$$,

which can be read as: “the probability of $Y$ given that you do $X$”. The expression above describes the case where $Y$ is independent of anything done to $X$. It specifies that there is no unidirectional causal relationship where $X$ causes $Y$.

=== Causal diagrams ===
A causal diagram consists of a set of nodes which may or may not be interlinked by arrows. Arrows between nodes denote causal relationships with the arrow pointing from the cause to the effect. There exist several forms of causal diagrams including Ishikawa diagrams, directed acyclic graphs, causal loop diagrams, why-because graphs (WBGs), and diagrams visualizing linear as well as nonlinear causal processes in both Venn diagram and lines-surfaces styles. The image below shows a partial why-because graph used to analyze the capsizing of the Herald of Free Enterprise.

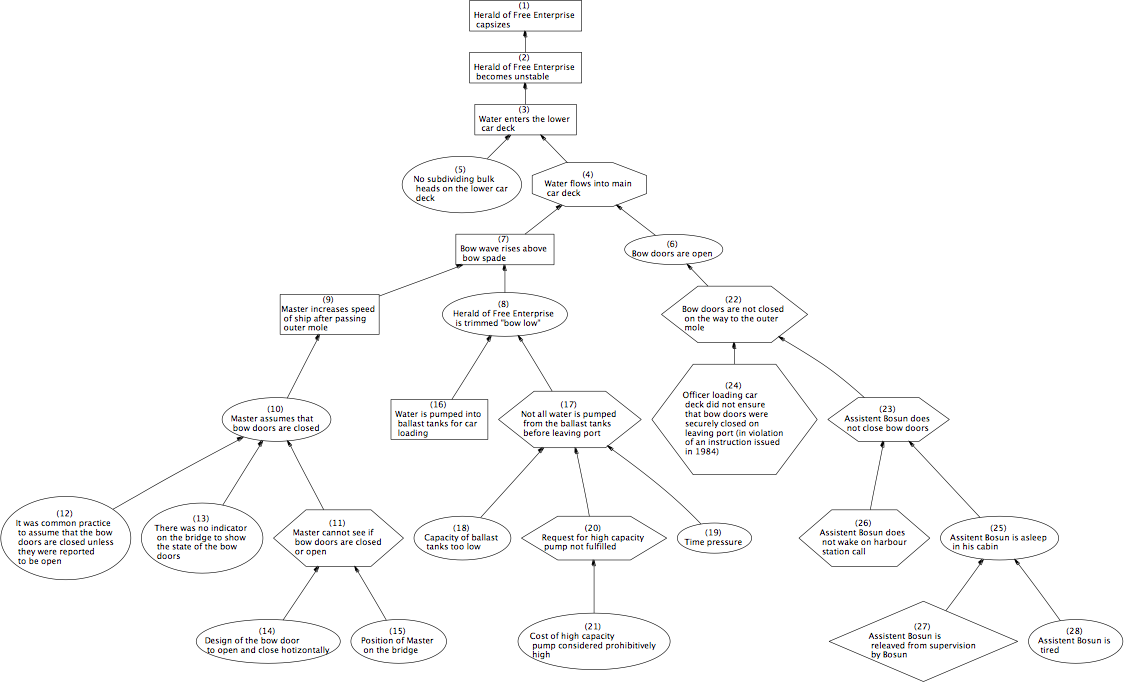
Partial Why–because graph of the capsizing of the Herald of Free Enterprise

=== Junction patterns ===
Junction patterns can be used to describe the graph structure of Bayesian networks. Three possible patterns allowed in a 3-node directed acyclic graph (DAG) include:

Junction patterns
Pattern	Model
Chain	$X \rightarrow Y \rightarrow Z$
Fork	$X \leftarrow Y \rightarrow Z$
Collider	$X \rightarrow Y \leftarrow Z$

=== Causal equality notation ===
Various forms of causal relationships exist. For instance, two quantities $a(s)$ and $b(s)$ can both be caused by a confounding variable $s$, but not by each other. Imagine a garbage strike in a large city, $s$, causes an increase in the smell of garbage, $a(s)$ and an increase in the rat population $b(s)$. Even though $b(s)$ does not cause $a(s)$ and vice versa, one can write an equation relating $b(s)$ and $a(s)$. The following table contains notation representing a variety of ways that $s$, $a(s)$ and $b(s)$ may be related to each other.

Causal equality notation
Symbolic expression	Defined relationships between $s$, $a(s)$ and $b(s)$
$s ~\overset{\rightarrow}{=}~ a\left(s\right)$	$a(s)$ is caused by $s$. The dependent variable is $a(s)$. The independent variable is $s$.
$s ~\overset{\leftarrow}{=}~ a\left(s\right)$	$s$ is caused by $a(s)$. The independent variable is $a(s)$. The dependent variable is $s$.
$s ~\overset{\leftrightarrow}{=}~ a\left(s\right)$	$a(s)$ and $s$ are mutually dependent, or bi-directionally causal.
$s ~\overset{\rightarrow}{=}~ a\left(s\right)$ $s ~\overset{\rightarrow}{=}~ b\left(s\right)$	Correlation: $a(s)$ and $b(s)$ are both caused by $s$: $a(s)~\overset{\curvearrowleft \curvearrowright }{=}~b(s)$. If a bi-directional causal relationship may exist, but this is not yet established, the notation $a\left(s\right) ~\overset{\curvearrowleft ? \curvearrowright }{=}~ b\left(s\right)$ can be used.
$s ~\overset{\rightarrow}{=}~ a\left(s\right)$ $s ~\overset{\leftarrow}{=}~ b\left(s\right)$	$b(s)$ causes $s~$ which in turn causes $a(s)$: $b(s)~\overset{\rightarrow}{=}~a(s)$
$s ~\overset{\leftarrow}{=}~ a\left(s\right)$ $s ~\overset{\rightarrow}{=}~ b\left(s\right)$	$a(s)$ causes $s~$ which in turn causes $b(s)$: $b(s)~\overset{\leftarrow}{=}~a(s)$.
$s ~\overset{\leftarrow}{=}~ a\left(s\right)$ $s ~\overset{\leftarrow}{=}~ b\left(s\right)$	Uncertainty/bicausal: $s~$ can be caused by $a(s)$ or $b(s)$: $a\left(s\right) ~\overset{\curvearrowright \curvearrowleft }{=}~ b\left(s\right)$, or $b(s)~\overset{>-<}{=}~a(s)$
$s ~\overset{\leftrightarrow}{=}~ a\left(s\right)$ $s ~\overset{\rightarrow}{=}~ b\left(s\right)$	$a(s)$ and $s$ are bi-directionally causal. $b(s)$ is caused by $a(s)$
$s ~\overset{\rightarrow}{=}~ a\left(s\right)$ $s ~\overset{\leftrightarrow}{=}~ b\left(s\right)$	$b(s)$ and $s$ are bi-directionally causal. $a(s)$ is caused by $b(s)$
$s ~\overset{\leftrightarrow}{=}~ a\left(s\right)$ $s ~\overset{\leftrightarrow}{=}~ b\left(s\right)$	$b(s)$ causes $a(s)$ and $a(s)~$ causes $b(s)$: $a(s)~\overset{\leftrightarrow}{=}~b(s)$. $b(s)$ and $a(s)$ are bi-directionally causal.
$s_1 ~\overset{arb.}{=}~ a\left(s_1\right)$ $s_2 ~\overset{arb.}{=}~ b\left(s_2\right)$	Mismatched indices indicate that for any arbitrary causal relation between $s_1$ and $a(s_1)$ or $s_2$ and $b(s_2)$, $a(s_1)$ and $b(s_2)$ cannot be related.

It should be assumed that a relationship between two equations with identical senses of causality (such as $s ~\overset{\rightarrow}{=}~ a\left(s\right)$, and $s ~\overset{\rightarrow}{=}~ b\left(s\right)$) is one of pure correlation unless both expressions are proven to be bi-directional causal equalities. In that case, the overall causal relationship between $b(s)$ and $a(s)$ is bi-directionally causal.
