= Orthogonal defect classification =

Software fault analysis

Orthogonal defect classification (ODC) turns semantic information in the software defect stream into a measurement on the process. The ideas were developed in the late 1980s and early 1990s by Ram Chillarege at IBM Research. This has led to the development of new analytical methods used for software development and test process analysis. ODC is process model, language and domain independent. Applications of ODC have been reported by several corporations on a variety of platforms and development processes, ranging from waterfall, spiral, gated, and agile development processes. One of the popular applications of ODC is software root cause analysis.

ODC as proposed in its original papers have specific attribute-value sets that create measurements on the development process. Two of the five more well known categories are the defect type and defect trigger. The defect type captures the changes made in the code as a result of the defect. There are seven values for defect type and they have been empirically established to provide a measurement of the product through the process through their distribution. The concept is that changes in the defect type distribution is a function of the development process model, and thus provides an intrinsic measurement of progress of the product through the process.

The defect trigger, similarly provides a measurement of the Testing process. The concept of the trigger is a key contribution that came through ODC and is now fairly widely used in technical and research publications. The software trigger is defined as the force that surfaced the Fault to create the failure. The full set of triggers is available in ODC Documentation.

The defect type and trigger collectively provide a large amount of causal information on defects. Additional information from the defect that is captured in standard ODC implementations includes "impact", "source" and "age". ODC training courses report that, once trained, an individual can categorize a defect via ODC in less than 3 minutes when performing the task retrospectively. The time taken is far lower when done in-flight, or in-process. The categorization cannot be directly compared to root-cause-analysis, since ODC data is about "what-is", not "why". However, root cause analysis is very commonly performed using ODC. The analysis that studies ODC data is performing the first pass of root cause analysis, which is confirmed by discussing the results with the development team. This approach has five primary differences between the classical method and the ODC method.

Individual defect analysis is just one of the applications of ODC. The original design of ODC was to create a measurement system for software engineering using the defect stream as a source of intrinsic measurements. Thus, the attributes, either singularly, or in conjunction with one of the others provides specific measurements on certain aspects of the engineering process. These measurements can be used for one or more analytical methods, since they were designed with general measurement principles in mind. Todate, several research papers have applied these for a variety of purposes. More recently, there have been research articles that use ODC to assess the methods used for security evaluation, and expanded the scope of ODC.

===== 2026 Jean Claude Laprie Award =====
The citation reads, "Orthogonal Defect Classification – A Concept for In-Process Measurements, by Ram Chillarege, Inderpal S. Bhandari, Jarir K. Chaar, Michael J. Halliday, Diane S. Moebus, Bonnie K. Ray, and Man-Yuen Wong, was the first paper to demonstrate how defects can be used as in‑process measurements to make software development measurable and controllable...and ODC has had a tremendous impact on industry, driving improvements in efficiency and reliability. Indeed, it has demonstrated significant, sometimes dramatic improvements in productivity and efficiency, and many companies have highlighted the impact of ODC on their developments. Among others, these companies are IBM, Nortel, and Motorola."

Several authors met at the DSN 2026 conference in Charlotte, NC turning it into a small reunion after 25 years. During the award talk, Ram Chillarege shared why the core ideas behind ODC still work after three generational shifts in software engineering. What originated during a period of Waterfall Development worked seamlessly with Iterative development in the '90s and then advanced into today's Agile development. This reinforces the strength of the core measurement model which remains unchanged in three decades. The Google citation index of the original ODC paper stands over 1200, with the recent years focusing on ML methods. The core ODC concepts are increasingly relevant given the present shift into AI generated code.
