= Why–because analysis =

Method for accident analysis to determine causal relationships

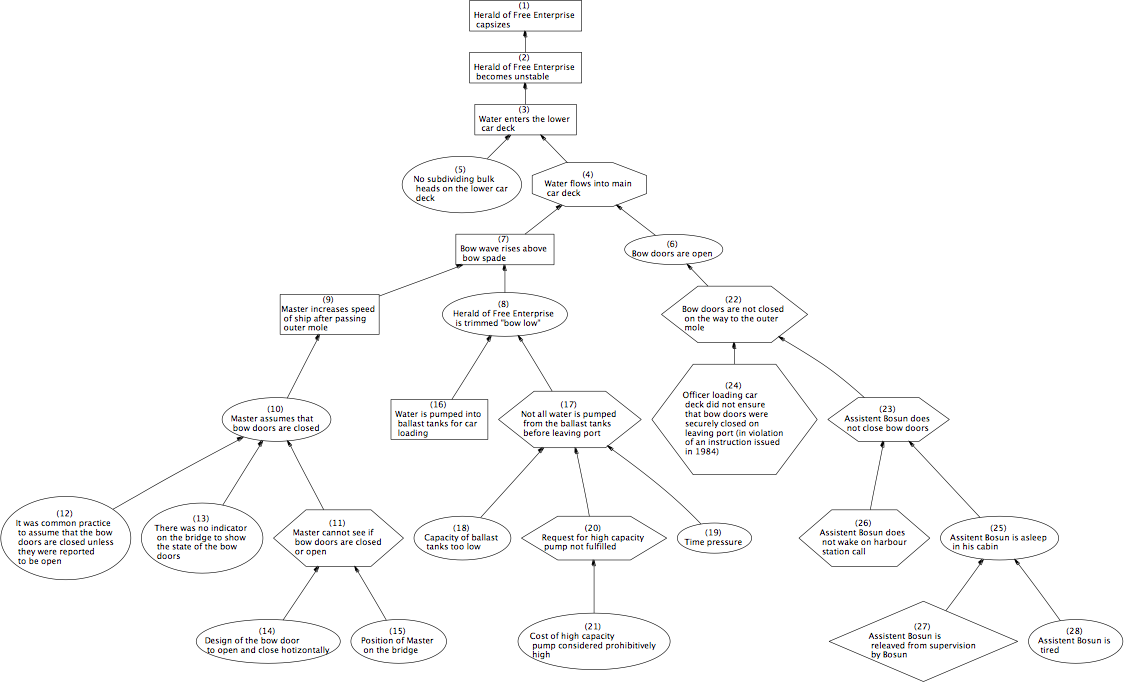
A partial why–because graph of the capsizing of the Herald of Free Enterprise

Why–because analysis (WBA) is a method for accident analysis using graph theory. It is independent of application domain and has been used to analyse, among others, aviation-, railway-, marine-, and computer-related accidents and incidents. It is mainly used as an after-the-fact (or a posteriori) analysis method, and it is applied to ensure that results are objective, falsifiable and reproducible. The result of such an analysis is a why–because graph (WBG), a type of causal notation used to represent interdependencies within a system and depict causal relations between factors of an accident. It is a directed acyclic graph, the nodes of which are factors. Directed edges denote cause–effect relations between the factors.

Why–because analyses start with questions regarding the nature of an accident (which is easy to define in many cases), followed by an iterative process to determine causes. When causes for an accident have been identified, formal tests are applied to all potential cause-effect relations. This process can be iterated for newfound causes, and so on, until a satisfactory result has been achieved. At each node (factor), each contributing cause (related factor) must have been necessary to cause the accident, and the totality of causes must have been sufficient to do so.

== Formal tests ==
Why–Because Analysis uses counterfactual tests and a causal completeness test to determine whether identified causes are necessary and whether the set of causes is complete.A counterfactual test (CT) leads back to David Lewis' formal notion of causality and counterfactuals. This test determines whether an effect would have happened without a particular cause, and proves or disproves that a cause is a necessary causal factor for an effect. A clear link between a cause and an effect can only be established if that effect cannot occur without that cause.

1. C happens, then E happens.
2. If E cannot occur unless C happens first, then C is a necessary causal factor for E and cannot be ruled out.
3. If E can occur without C happening first, then C is not necessary for E to occur.

A causal sufficiency test (CST) determines whether the occurrence of all of the attributed causes together is guaranteed to result in a given effect. It aims at deciding whether a set of causes are sufficient for an effect to happen. The missing causes can thus be identified.

1. C happens, then E happens.
2. If C always results in E, then C is a sufficient causal factor for E, and other causal factors are not necessary.
3. If C does not always result in E, then C is insufficient for E to occur.

A why–because graph can be correct only if the causal sufficiency test is positive for all causal relations and for all sets of causes to their effects:

- Each cause must be necessary (CT)
- The totality of causes must be sufficient (CST)
- Nothing is omitted (CST: the listed causes are sufficient)
- Nothing is superfluous (CT: each cause is necessary)

Occurrence of effect		CT	CST
After its cause(s)	w/o its cause(s)	CT	CST
Possible	Possible	Unnecessary	Insufficient
Possible	Impossible	Necessary	Insufficient
Certain	Certain	Unnecessary	Sufficient
Certain	Possible	Unnecessary	Sufficient
Certain	Impossible	Necessary	Sufficient

== See also ==
- Accident
- Cause–effect graph
- Fault tree analysis
- Five whys
- Ishikawa diagram
- Issue map
- Issue tree
- Root cause analysis
