= Five whys =

Iterative interrogative technique

Five whys (or 5 whys) is an iterative interrogative technique used to explore the cause-and-effect relationships underlying a particular problem. The primary goal of the technique is to determine the root cause of a defect or problem by repeating the question "why?" five times, each time directing the current "why" to the answer of the previous "why".

The method asserts that the answer to the final "why" asked in this manner should reveal the root cause of the problem. The number of whys may be higher or lower depending on the complexity of the analysis and problem.

The technique was described by Taiichi Ohno at Toyota Motor Corporation. Others at Toyota and elsewhere have criticized the five whys technique for being too basic and having an arbitrarily shallow depth as a root cause analysis tool (see § Criticism).

== Example ==
An example of a problem is: bolts are cross-threading in the engine block on the production line.

1. Why? – The threads aren't cut cleanly.
2. Why? – The cutting tool on the lathe wasn't changed today.
3. Why? – The replacement cutting tool bin was empty.
4. Why? – The bin's contents had fallen and rolled under the shelves.
5. Why? – One of the feet on the shelves has rusted and failed, making the shelves unstable, and when it was jostled, many parts fell on the floor, including the lost cutting tools.

In this example, five iterations of asking why is sufficient to get to a root cause that can be addressed. The key idea of the method is to encourage the troubleshooter to avoid assumptions and logic traps and instead trace the chain of causality in direct increments from the effect through any layers of abstraction to a root cause that still has some connection to the original problem. In this example, the fifth "why" suggests a broken shelf foot, which can be immediately replaced to prevent the reoccurrence of the sequence of events that resulted in cross-threading bolts.

The nature of the answer to the fifth why in the example is also an important aspect of the five why approach, because solving the immediate problem may not solve the problem in the long run; the shelf foot may fail again. The real root cause points toward a process that is not working well or does not exist. In this case, the factory may need to add a process for regularly inspecting shelving units for instability, and fixing them when broken.

== History ==
=== Historical precursors ===
In history, there are early examples of repeated questions to gain knowledge, such as in Plato's Meno. Aristotle developed a different approach with the four causes to develop four fundamental types of answer to the question 'why?'.

In his 13th-century work Bescheidenheit, didactic poet Freidank presents a five-link causal chain that, when read in reverse, can be understood as an early structural analogue of the Five Whys method. It is the earliest known surviving antecedent of the proverb For Want of a Nail. Unlike the Five Whys method, Freidank does not work backwards from an observed problem towards its root cause. Instead, he traces the chain forwards, from the smallest component to the larger whole. He does not present the idea as his own invention, introducing the passage with the words The wise tell us, thereby identifying it as traditional wisdom.

Gottfried Wilhelm Leibniz used iterative why questions in his letter to Magnus von Wedderkop in 1671, in which he applied elements of argumentation that he later used to solve the question of theodicy:

- Consider Pilate, who is damned. Why? (Cur Pilatus damnatus est?)
  - Because he lacks faith. (Quia fidem non habuit.)
- Why does he lack it? (Cur fidem non habuit?)
  - Because he lacked the will to be attentive. (Quia voluntatem attentandi non habuit.)
- Why does he lack this? (Cur voluntatem attentandi non habuit?)
  - Because he did not understand the necessity of the matter, the usefulness of being attentive. (Quia utilitatem non intellexit.)
- Why did he not understand? (Cur non intellexit?)
  - Because the causes of understanding were lacking. (Quia causae intellegendi defuerunt.)

There is also a historical link to the Confucian tradition. The Doctrine of the Mean contains a principle of persistent enquiry: when one asks a question but does not yet understand, one should not abandon the inquiry. The same principle is applied to learning, reflection, discrimination and action. In the twelfth century, Zhu Xi made the Neo-Confucian idea of ‘’窮理’’ (“exhausting” or fully investigating the underlying principle of a matter) central to his epistemology. His interpretation of the Great Learning emphasised building on existing knowledge and investigating further until the underlying principle had been fully explored. This intellectual tradition became highly influential in Japan. Ninomiya Sontoku, founder of the practical Hōtoku philosophy and movement, acquired works transmitting Zhu Xi’s interpretations of the Confucian classics and himself used the language of “investigating the underlying principle”. He developed practical economic and social reform methods based on close observation, stepwise analysis, measurement and improvement. The Hōtoku tradition subsequently spread to the region and family environment in which Sakichi Toyoda grew up. His father, Ikichi Toyoda, was an active adherent of Hōtoku. Finally, Taiichi Ohno is recorded as explicitly linking the Five Whys to Sakichi Toyoda’s investigative attitude of persistently observing a real process until its underlying mechanism became clear.

=== Development and applications ===
The modern technique was originally developed by Sakichi Toyoda and was used within the Toyota Motor Corporation during the evolution of its manufacturing methodologies. It is a major component of problem-solving training, delivered as part of the induction into the Toyota Production System. The architect of the Toyota Production System, Taiichi Ohno, described the five whys method as "the basis of Toyota's scientific approach by repeating why five times the nature of the problem as well as its solution becomes clear."

The tool has seen use beyond Toyota, and is now used within Kaizen, lean manufacturing, lean construction and Six Sigma. The five whys were initially developed to understand why new product features or manufacturing techniques were needed, and was not developed for root cause analysis.

In other companies, it appears in other forms. Under Ricardo Semler, Semco practices "three whys" and broadens the practice to cover goal setting and decision-making.

== Techniques ==
Two primary techniques are used to perform a five whys analysis: the fishbone (or Ishikawa) diagram and a tabular format.

These tools allow for analysis to be branched in order to provide multiple root causes.

== Criticism ==
The five whys technique has been criticized as a poor tool for root cause analysis. Teruyuki Minoura, former managing director of global purchasing for Toyota, criticized it as being too basic a tool to analyze root causes at the depth necessary to ensure an issue is fixed. Reasons for this criticism include:

- Tendency for investigators to stop at symptoms rather than going on to lower-level root causes.
- Inability to go beyond the investigator's current knowledge – the investigator cannot find causes that they do not already know.
- Lack of support to help the investigator provide the right answer to "why" questions.
- Results are not repeatable – different people using five whys come up with different causes for the same problem.
- Tendency to isolate a single root cause, whereas each question could elicit many different root causes.

Medical professor Alan J. Card also criticized the five whys as a poor root cause analysis tool and suggested that it be abandoned because of the following reasons:

- The arbitrary depth of the fifth why is unlikely to correlate with the root cause.
- The five whys is based on a misguided reuse of a strategy to understand why new features should be added to products, not a root cause analysis.

To avoid these issues, Card suggested instead using other root cause analysis tools such as fishbone or lovebug diagrams.

== See also ==
- Eight disciplines problem solving
- Five Ws (information-gathering)
- Four causes
- Issue map
- Issue tree
- Root cause analysis
- Socratic method
- Why–because analysis
