= Eight disciplines problem solving =

Eight disciplines of team-oriented problem solving method

Eight Disciplines Methodology (8D) is a method or model developed at Ford Motor Company used to approach and to resolve problems, typically employed by quality engineers or other professionals. Focused on product and process improvement, its purpose is to identify, correct, and eliminate recurring problems. It establishes a permanent corrective action based on statistical analysis of the problem and on the origin of the problem by determining the root causes. Although it originally comprised eight stages, or 'disciplines', it was later augmented by an initial planning stage. 8D follows the logic of the PDCA cycle. The disciplines are:

D0: Preparation and Emergency Response Actions: Plan for solving the problem and determine the prerequisites. Provide emergency response actions.
D1: Use a Team: Establish a team of people with product/process knowledge. Teammates provide new perspectives and different ideas when it comes to problem solving.
D2: Describe the Problem: Specify the problem by identifying in quantifiable terms the who, what, where, when, why, how, and how many (5W2H) for the problem.
D3: Develop Interim Containment Plan: Define and implement containment actions to isolate the problem from any customer.
D4: Determine and Verify Root Causes and Escape Points: Identify all applicable causes that could explain why the problem has occurred. Also identify why the problem was not noticed at the time it occurred. All causes shall be verified or proved. One can use five whys or Ishikawa diagrams to map causes against the effect or problem identified.
D5: Verify Permanent Corrections (PCs) for Problem that will resolve the problem for the customer: Using pre-production programs, quantitatively confirm that the selected correction will resolve the problem. (Verify that the correction will actually solve the problem).
D6: Define and Implement Corrective Actions: Define and implement the best corrective actions. Also, validate corrective actions with empirical evidence of improvement.
D7: Prevent Recurrence / System Problems: Modify the management systems, operation systems, practices, and procedures to prevent recurrence of this and similar problems.
D8: Congratulate the Main Contributors to your Team: Recognize the collective efforts of the team. The team needs to be formally thanked by the organization.

8Ds has become a standard in the automotive, assembly, and other industries that require a thorough structured problem-solving process using a team approach.

== Ford Motor Company's team-oriented problem solving ==
The executives of the Powertrain Organization (transmissions, chassis, engines) wanted a methodology where teams (design engineering, manufacturing engineering, and production) could work on recurring chronic problems. In 1986, the assignment was given to develop a manual and a subsequent course that would achieve a new approach to solving identified engineering design and manufacturing problems. The manual for this methodology was documented and defined in Team Oriented Problem Solving (TOPS), first published in 1987. The manual and subsequent course material were piloted at Ford World Headquarters in Dearborn, Michigan. Ford refers to their current variant as G8D (Global 8D). The Ford 8Ds manual is extensive and covers chapter by chapter how to go about addressing, quantifying, and resolving engineering issues. It begins with a cross-functional team and concludes with a successful demonstrated resolution of the problem. Containment actions may or may not be needed based on where the problem occurred in the life cycle of the product.

== Usage ==
Many disciplines are typically involved in the "8Ds" methodology. The tools used can be found in textbooks and reference materials used by quality assurance professionals. For example, an "Is/Is Not" worksheet is a common tool employed at D2, and Ishikawa, or "fishbone," diagrams and "5-why analysis" are common tools employed at step D4. In the late 1990s, Ford developed a revised version of the 8D process that they call "Global 8D" (G8D), which is the current global standard for Ford and many other companies in the automotive supply chain. The major revisions to the process are as follows:

- Addition of a D0 (D-Zero) step as a gateway to the process. At D0, the team documents the symptoms that initiated the effort along with any emergency response actions (ERAs) that were taken before formal initiation of the G8D. D0 also incorporates standard assessing questions meant to determine whether a full G8D is required. The assessing questions are meant to ensure that in a world of limited problem-solving resources, the efforts required for a full team-based problem-solving effort are limited to those problems that warrant these resources.
- Addition of the notion of escape points to D4 through D6. An 'escape point' is the earliest control point in the control system following the root cause of a problem that should have detected that problem but failed to do so. The idea here is to consider not only the root cause, but also what went wrong with the control system in allowing this problem to escape. Global 8D requires the team to identify and verify an escape point at D4. Then, through D5 and D6, the process requires the team to choose, verify, implement, and validate permanent corrective actions to address the escape point.

Recently, the 8D process has been employed significantly outside the auto industry. As part of lean initiatives and continuous-improvement processes it is employed extensively in the food manufacturing, health care, and high-tech manufacturing industries.

== Benefits ==
The benefits of the 8D methodology include effective approaches to finding a root cause, developing proper actions to eliminate root causes, and implementing the permanent corrective action. The 8D methodology also helps to explore the control systems that allowed the problem to escape. The Escape Point is studied for the purpose of improving the ability of the Control System to detect the failure or cause when and if it should occur again. Finally the Prevention Loop explores the systems that permitted the condition that allowed the Failure and Cause Mechanism to exist in the first place.

== Prerequisites ==
Requires training in the 8D problem-solving process as well as appropriate data collection and analysis tools such as Pareto charts, fishbone diagrams, and process maps.

== Problem solving tools ==
The following tools can be used within 8D:

- Ishikawa diagrams also known as cause-and-effect or fishbone diagrams
- Pareto charts or Pareto diagrams
- 5 Whys
- 5W and 2H (who, what, where, when, why, how, how many or how much)
- Statistical process control
- Scatter plots
- Design of experiments
- Check sheet
- Histograms
- FMEA
- Flowcharts or process maps

== Background of common corrective actions to dispose of nonconforming items ==
The 8D methodology was first described in a Ford manual in 1987. The manual describes the eight-step methodology to address chronic product and process problems. The 8Ds included several concepts of effective problem solving, including taking corrective actions and containing nonconforming items. These two steps have been very common in most manufacturing facilities, including government and military installations. In 1974, the U.S. Department of Defense (DOD) released “MIL-STD 1520 Corrective Action and Disposition System for Nonconforming Material”. This 13 page standard defines establishing some corrective actions and then taking containment actions on nonconforming material or items. It is focused on inspection for defects and disposing of them. The basic idea of corrective actions and containment of defectives was officially abolished in 1995, but these concepts were also common to Ford Motor Company, a major supplier to the government in World War II. Corrective actions and containment of poor quality parts were part of the manual and course for the automotive industry and are well known to many companies. Ford's 60 page manual covers details associated with each step in their 8D problem solving manual and the actions to take to deal with identified problems.

=== Military usage ===
The exact history of the 8D method remains disputed as many publications and websites state that it originates from the US military. Indeed, MIL-STD-1520C outlines a set of requirements for their contractors on how they should organize themselves with respect to non-conforming materials. Developed in 1974 and cancelled in February 1995 as part of the Perry memo, you can compare it best to the ISO 9001 standard that currently exists as it expresses the same philosophy. The aforementioned military standard does outline some aspects that are in the 8D method, however, it does not provide the same structure that the 8D methodology offers. Taking into account the fact that the Ford Motor Company played an instrumental role in producing army vehicles during the Second World War and in the decades after, it could very well be the case that the MIL-STD-1520C stood as a model for today's 8D method.

== Relationship between 8D and FMEA ==
FMEA (failure mode and effect analysis) is a tool generally used in the planning of product or process design. The relationships between 8D and FMEA are outlined below:

1. The problem statements and descriptions are sometimes linked between both documents. An 8D can utilize pre-brainstormed information from a FMEA to assist in looking for potential problems.
2. Possible causes in a FMEA can immediately be used to jump start 8D Fishbone or Ishikawa diagrams. Brainstorming information that is already known is not a good use of time or resources.
3. Data and brainstorming collected during an 8D can be placed into a FMEA for future planning of new product or process quality. This allows a FMEA to consider actual failures, occurring as failure modes and causes, becoming more effective and complete.
4. The design or process controls in a FMEA can be used in verifying the root cause and Permanent Corrective Action in an 8D.

The FMEA and 8D should reconcile each failure and cause by cross documenting failure modes, problem statements and possible causes. Each FMEA can be used as a database of possible causes of failure as an 8D is developed.

== See also ==
- Complaint system – Set of procedures used in organizations to address complaints & resolve disputes
- Corrective and preventive action – Improvements in an organization to eliminate non-conformities or undesirable situations
- Failure mode and effects analysis – Analysis of potential system failures
- Fault tree analysis – Failure analysis system used in safety engineering and reliability engineering
- Quality management system (QMS)
- Eight dimensions of quality – Measures of product quality
- Problem solving – Process of achieving a goal by overcoming obstacles
