= Issue tree =

Graphical breakdown for problem solving

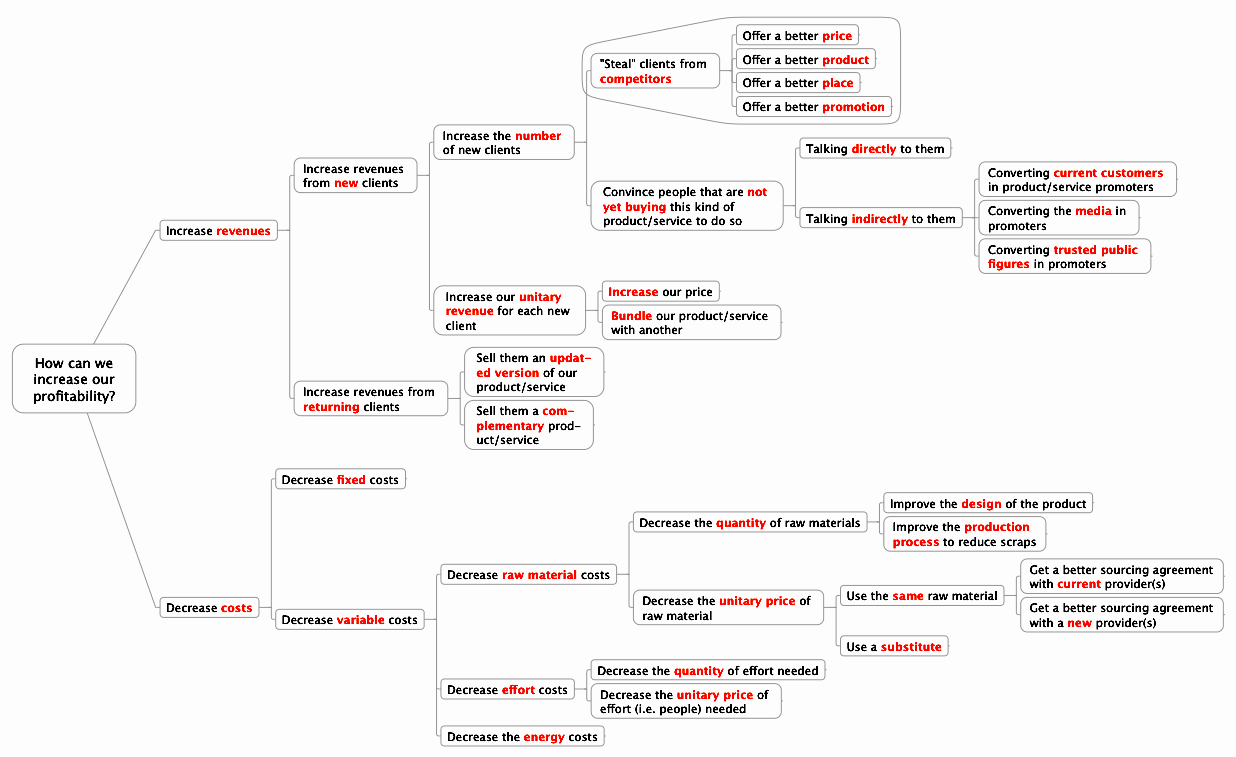
An issue tree showing how a company can increase profitability: A profitability tree is an example of an issue tree. It looks at different ways in which a company can increase its profitability. Starting from the key question on the left, it breaks it down between revenues and costs, and break these down into further details.

An issue tree, also called logic tree, is a graphical breakdown of a question that dissects it into its different components vertically and that progresses into details as it reads to the right.

Issue trees are useful in problem solving to identify the root causes of a problem as well as to identify its potential solutions. They also provide a reference point to see how each piece fits into the whole picture of a problem.

== Types ==
According to professor of strategy Arnaud Chevallier, elaborating an approach used at McKinsey & Company, there are two types of issue trees: diagnostic ones and solution ones. Diagnostic trees break down a "why" key question, identifying all the possible root causes for the problem. Solution trees break down a "how" key question, identifying all the possible alternatives to fix the problem.

== Rules ==
Four basic rules can help ensure that issue trees are optimal, according to Chevallier:

1. Consistently answer a "why" or a "how" question
2. Progress from the key question to the analysis as it moves to the right
3. Have branches that are mutually exclusive and collectively exhaustive (MECE)
4. Use an insightful breakdown

The requirement for issue trees to be collectively exhaustive implies that divergent thinking is a critical skill.

== Applications ==
=== In management interviews ===
Issue trees are used to answer questions in case interviews for management consulting positions. A quantitative type of question, the market sizing question, requires the interviewee to estimate the size of a data group such as a specific segment of a population, an amount of objects, a company's revenues, or similar. The candidates are expected to use a structured and logical method of arriving at their answer, and using an issue tree provides a diagram to aid the candidate's logical reasoning. Issue trees are used for other types of case interview questions as well.

== See also ==
- Fault tree analysis
- Five whys
- Horizon scanning
- Ishikawa diagram
- Root cause analysis
- Why–because analysis
