= Patricia Cheng =

American psychologist (born 1952)

- Born: 1952 (age 73–74); Hong Kong

Academic background
- Education: Barnard College, University of Michigan

Academic work
- Discipline: psychology
- Sub-discipline: cognitive psychology
- Institutions: Chinese University of Hong Kong; University of California, Los Angeles
- Main interests: understanding of causality

Patricia Wenjie Cheng (born 1952) is a Chinese American psychologist. She is a leading researcher in cognitive psychology who works on human reasoning. She is best known for her psychological work on human understanding of causality. Her "power theory of the probabilistic contrast model," or power PC theory (1997) posits that people filter observations of events through a basic belief that causes have the power to generate (or prevent) their effects, thereby inferring specific cause-effect relations.

== Biography ==
Cheng was born in Hong Kong in 1952. She received her B.A. from Barnard College, and her PhD in Psychology from the University of Michigan in 1980. She then taught at the Chinese University of Hong Kong. After post-doctoral training in the Department of Computer Science at Carnegie-Mellon University, she joined the faculty of the University of California, Los Angeles in 1986, where she is now a Professor of Psychology. Cheng received a fellowship from the John Simon Guggenheim Memorial Foundation in 2000. She is also a Fellow of the Association for Psychological Science.

== Selected works ==
- Cheng, Patricia W.; Holyoak, Keith J. (1985). "Pragmatic reasoning schemas". Cognitive Psychology. 17 (4): 391–416. doi:10.1016/0010-0285(85)90014-3. hdl:2027.42/25556. PMID 4064622. S2CID 5316709.
- Cheng, Patricia W.; Holyoak, Keith J.; Nisbett, Richard E.; Oliver, Lindsay M. (1986). "Pragmatic versus syntactic approaches to training deductive reasoning". Cognitive Psychology. 18 (3): 293–328. doi:10.1016/0010-0285(86)90002-2. hdl:2027.42/26121. PMID 3742999. S2CID 10376933.
- Nisbett, R.; Fong, G.; Lehman, D.; Cheng, P. (1987). "Teaching reasoning". Science. 238 (4827): 625–631. Bibcode:1987Sci...238..625N. doi:10.1126/science.3672116. hdl:2027.42/92170. PMID 3672116.
- Cheng, Patricia W.; Holyoak, Keith J. (1989). "On the natural selection of reasoning theories". Cognition. 33 (3): 285–313. doi:10.1016/0010-0277(89)90031-0. PMID 2605884. S2CID 26131874.
- Cheng, Patricia W.; Novick, Laura R. (1991). "Causes versus enabling conditions". Cognition. 40 (1–2): 83–120. doi:10.1016/0010-0277(91)90047-8. PMID 1786673. S2CID 15106017.
- Cheng, Patricia W. (1997). "From covariation to causation: A causal power theory". Psychological Review. 104 (2): 367–405. doi:10.1037/0033-295X.104.2.367.
- Lu, Hongjing; Yuille, Alan L.; Liljeholm, Mimi; Cheng, Patricia W.; Holyoak, Keith J. (2008). "Bayesian generic priors for causal learning". Psychological Review. 115 (4): 955–984. doi:10.1037/a0013256. PMID 18954210. S2CID 10871785.
- Holyoak, Keith J.; Cheng, Patricia W. (2011). "Causal Learning and Inference as a Rational Process: The New Synthesis". Annual Review of Psychology. 62: 135–163. doi:10.1146/annurev.psych.121208.131634. PMID 21126179. S2CID 15335444.

== See also ==
- Causal reasoning
