= Four causes =

Topic in Aristotelian philosophy

Aristotle's four causes illustrated for a table: material (wood), formal (structure), efficient (carpentry), final (dining)

The four causes are, in Aristotelian thought, categories of questions that explain "the whys" of something that exists or changes in nature. The four causes are the material cause, the formal cause, the efficient cause, and the final cause. According to Aristotle, knowledge of a thing requires an understanding of its cause. While there are cases in which classifying a cause is difficult, or in which causes coincide, Aristotle held that his four causes provided an analytical scheme of general applicability.

Aristotle's word aitia (αἰτία) has, in philosophical scholarly tradition, been translated as "cause". This technical use of the word differs from its everyday meaning;a closer translation of Aristotle's αἰτία in contemporary English is "explanation".

== Overview ==
In Physics II.3, I.7–9 and Metaphysics V.2, Aristotle holds that there are four kinds of answers to "why" questions:

Matter
The material cause of a change or movement. Aristotle defines matter as "the primary substratum of each thing, from which it comes to be per se, [substantially], and that persists in the result." – Physics I.9. Matter is what allows a thing to change, either accidentally, such as a change in shape, or substantially, such as the death of a living thing, or a compound returning to its elemental parts. Aristotle gives the examples of a table's matter being wood, or a statue's matter being bronze or marble.
Form
The formal cause of a change or movement. Aristotle defines form as "the terminus of the process of [change]." - Metaphysics V.4. It is what something changes into, i.e. what makes a thing what it is. Form is often confused with the whole substance, whereas it is a thing's essential difference, for example, man is a rational animal, what makes man a man, is his rationality, i.e. what makes him different from other animals.
Efficient, or agent
The efficient or moving cause of a change or movement. This consists of things apart from the thing being changed or moved, which interact so as to be an agency of the change or movement. For example, the efficient cause of a table is a carpenter, or a person working as one, and according to Aristotle the efficient cause of a child is a parent.
Final, or end
The final cause of a change or movement. This is a change or movement for the sake of a thing to be what it is. For a seed, it might be an adult plant; for a sailboat, it might be sailing; for a ball at the top of a ramp, it might be coming to rest at the bottom. Often the final cause is confused with a purpose, or intention, but this is not the case, since a purpose is the effect wanted for a thing by a person, whereas Aristotle thought of ends as always present, ungiven, and always good.

The four "causes" are not mutually exclusive. For Aristotle, several, preferably four, answers to the question "why" have to be given to explain a phenomenon and especially the actual configuration of an object. For example, if asking why a table is such and such, an explanation in terms of the four causes would sound like this: This table is solid and brown because it is made of wood (matter); it does not collapse because it has four legs of equal length (form); it is as it is because a carpenter made it, starting from a tree (agent); it has these dimensions because it is to be used by humans (end).

Aristotle distinguished between intrinsic and extrinsic causes. Matter and form are intrinsic causes because they deal directly with the object, whereas efficient and finality causes are said to be extrinsic because they are external.

Thomas Aquinas demonstrated that only those four types of causes can exist and no others. He also introduced a priority order according to which "matter is made perfect by the form, form is made perfect by the agent, and agent is made perfect by the finality." Hence, the finality is the cause of causes or, equivalently, the queen of causes.

== Definition of "cause" ==
In his philosophical writings, Aristotle used the Greek word αἴτιον (aition), a neuter singular form of an adjective. The Greek word had meant, perhaps originally in a "legal" context, what or who is "responsible," mostly but not always in a bad sense of "guilt" or "blame." Alternatively, it could mean "to the credit of" someone or something. The appropriation of this word by Aristotle and other philosophers reflects how the Greek experience of legal practice influenced the concern in Greek thought to determine what is responsible. The word developed other meanings, including its use in philosophy in a more abstract sense.

Aristotle, in The Metaphysics V.3, defines a cause as, "...that from which, as something intrinsic, a thing comes to be..." Some later scholastics redefined a cause as, "that from which something proceeds."

== Aristotle's four causes ==
Aristotle used the four causes to provide different answers to the question, "because of what?" The four answers to this question illuminate different aspects of how a thing comes into being or of how an event takes place.

=== Material ===
Aristotle considers the material "cause" (ὕλη, hū́lē) of an object as equivalent to the nature of the raw material out of which the object is composed. (The word "nature" for Aristotle applies to both its potential in the raw material and its ultimate finished form. In a sense this form already existed in the material: see potentiality and actuality.)

Whereas modern physics looks to simple bodies, Aristotle's physics took a more general viewpoint, and treated living things as exemplary. Nevertheless, he argued that simple natural bodies such as earth, fire, air, and water also showed signs of having their own innate sources of motion, change, and rest. Fire, for example, carries things upwards, unless stopped from doing so. Things formed by human artifice, such as beds and cloaks, have no innate tendency to become beds or cloaks.

In traditional Aristotelian philosophical terminology, material is not the same as substance. Matter has parallels with substance in so far as primary matter serves as the substratum for simple bodies which are not substance: sand and rock (mostly earth), rivers and seas (mostly water), atmosphere and wind (mostly air and then mostly fire below the moon). In this traditional terminology, 'substance' is a term of ontology, referring to really existing things; only individuals are said to be substances (subjects) in the primary sense. Secondary substance, in a different sense, also applies to man-made artifacts.

=== Formal ===
Aristotle considers the formal "cause" (εἶδος, eîdos) as the internal cause by which a thing is what it is. Often, form is confused with what Aristotelians call accidental form, i.e. what makes an inhering part what it is. Some say that form is the arrangement or shape of a thing, but this is not the case, since Aristotle would define these things as accidents, (falling under quality and position, respectively), while he defines form as the principle of a substance. This mistake is made because, with some things, what makes them what they are is their accidents. These things are called accidental beings. For things such as a three-legged stool, what makes it what it is is the number of legs it has, which is a quantity. But for other things, such as a bowl, if defined as a tool which has the ability to hold liquids, what makes it what it is is not its shape, but its ability to hold liquids, since its shape could change, and it could still have its ability.

By Aristotle's own account, this is a difficult and controversial concept. It links with theories of forms such as those of Aristotle's teacher, Plato, but in Aristotle's own account (see his Metaphysics), he takes into account many previous writers who had expressed opinions about forms and ideas, but he shows how his own views differ from them.

=== Efficient ===
Aristotle defines the agent or efficient "cause" (κινοῦν, kinoûn) of an object as that which causes change and drives transient motion (such as a painter painting a house) (see Aristotle, Physics II 3, 194b29). In many cases, this is simply the thing that brings something about. For example, in the case of a statue, it is the person chiseling away which transforms a block of marble into a statue. According to Lloyd, of the four causes, only this one is what is meant by the modern English word "cause" in ordinary speech.

=== Final ===
Aristotle defines the end, purpose, or final "cause" (τέλος, télos) as that for the sake of which a thing is done. Like the form, this is a controversial type of explanation in science; some have argued for its survival in evolutionary biology, while Ernst Mayr denied that it continued to play a role. It is commonly recognized that Aristotle's conception of nature is teleological in the sense that Nature exhibits functionality in a more general sense than is exemplified in the purposes that humans have. Aristotle observed that a telos does not necessarily involve deliberation, intention, consciousness, or intelligence:

This is most obvious in the animals other than man: they make things neither by art nor after inquiry or deliberation. That is why people wonder whether it is by intelligence or by some other faculty that these creatures work, – spiders, ants, and the like... It is absurd to suppose that purpose is not present because we do not observe the agent deliberating. Art does not deliberate. If the ship-building art were in the wood, it would produce the same results by nature. If, therefore, purpose is present in art, it is present also in nature.

— Aristotle, Physics, II.8

According to Aristotle, a seed has the eventual adult plant as its end (i.e., as its telos) if and only if the seed would become the adult plant under normal circumstances. In Physics II.9, Aristotle hazards a few arguments that a determination of the end (i.e., final cause) of a phenomenon is more important than the others. He argues that the end is that which brings it about, so for example "if one defines the operation of sawing as being a certain kind of dividing, then this cannot come about unless the saw has teeth of a certain kind; and these cannot be unless it is of iron." According to Aristotle, once a final "cause" is in place, the material, efficient and formal "causes" follow by necessity. However, he recommends that the student of nature determine the other "causes" as well, and notes that not all phenomena have an end, e.g., chance events.

Aristotle saw that his biological investigations provided insights into the causes of things, especially into the final cause:

We should approach the investigation of every kind of animal without being ashamed, since in each one of them there is something natural and something beautiful. The absence of chance and the serving of ends are found in the works of nature especially. And the end, for the sake of which a thing has been constructed or has come to be, belongs to what is beautiful.

— Aristotle, On the Parts of Animals 645^{a 21–26}, Book I, Part 5.

George Holmes Howison highlights "final causation" in presenting his theory of metaphysics, which he terms "personal idealism", and to which he invites not only man, but all (ideal) life:

Here, in seeing that Final Cause – causation at the call of self-posited aim or end – is the only full and genuine cause, we further see that Nature, the cosmic aggregate of phenomena and the cosmic bond of their law which in the mood of vague and inaccurate abstraction we call Force, is after all only an effect... Thus teleology, or the Reign of Final Cause, the reign of ideality, is not only an element in the notion of Evolution, but is the very vital cord in the notion. The conception of evolution is founded at last and essentially in the conception of Progress: but this conception has no meaning at all except in the light of a goal; there can be no goal unless there is a Beyond for everything actual; and there is no such Beyond except through a spontaneous ideal. The presupposition of Nature, as a system undergoing evolution, is therefore the causal activity of our Pure Ideals. These are our three organic and organizing conceptions called the True, the Beautiful, and the Good.

— George Holmes Howison, The Limits of Evolution (1901)

However, Edward Feser argues, in line with the Aristotelian and Thomistic tradition, that finality has been greatly misunderstood. Indeed, without finality, efficient causality becomes inexplicable. Finality thus understood is not purpose but that end towards which a thing is ordered. When a match is rubbed against the side of a matchbox, the effect is not the appearance of an elephant or the sounding of a drum, but fire. The effect is not arbitrary because the match is ordered towards the end of fire which is realized through efficient causes.

In their biosemiotic study, Stuart Kauffman, Robert K. Logan et al. (2007) remark:

Our language is teleological. We believe that autonomous agents constitute the minimal physical system to which teleological language rightly applies.

— Biology and Philosophy

== Scholasticism ==
In Scholasticism, the efficient causality was governed by two principles:

- omne agens agit simile sibi (every agent produces something similar to itself): stated frequently in the writings of St. Thomas Aquinas, the principle establishes a relationship of similarity and analogy between cause and effect;
- nemo dat quod non habet (no one gives what he does not possess): partially similar to the legal principle of the same name, it establishes that the cause cannot bestow on the effect the quantity of being (and thus of unity, truth, goodness, reality and perfection) that it does not already possess within itself. Otherwise, there would be creation out of nothingness of self and other-from-self. In other words, the cause must possess a degree of reality greater than or equal to that of the effect. If it is greater, we speak of equivocal causation, in analogy to the three types of philosophical predication (univocal, equivocal, analogical); if it is equal, we speak of univocal predication.

Thomas in this regard distinguished between causa fiendi (cause of occurring, of only beginning to be) and causa essendi (cause of being and also of beginning to be) When the being of the agent cause is in the effect in a lesser or equal degree, this is a causa fiendi. Furthermore, the second principle also establishes a qualitative link: the cause can only transmit its own essence to the effect. For example, a dog cannot transmit the essence of a feline to its young, but only that of a dog. The principle is equivalent to that of Causa aequat effectum (cause equals effect) in both a quantitative and qualitative sense.

== Modern science ==
In his Advancement of Learning (1605), Francis Bacon wrote that natural science "doth make inquiry, and take consideration of the same natures : but how? Only as to the material and efficient causes of them, and not as to the forms." Using the terminology of Aristotle, Bacon demands that, apart from the "laws of nature" themselves, the causes relevant to natural science are only efficient causes and material causes, or, to use the formulation which became famous later, natural phenomena require scientific explanation in terms of matter and motion.

In The New Organon, Bacon divides knowledge into physics and metaphysics:

From the two kinds of axioms which have been spoken of arises a just division of philosophy and the sciences, taking the received terms (which come nearest to express the thing) in a sense agreeable to my own views. Thus, let the investigation of forms, which are (in the eye of reason at least, and in their essential law) eternal and immutable, constitute Metaphysics; and let the investigation of the efficient cause, and of matter, and of the latent process, and the latent configuration (all of which have reference to the common and ordinary course of nature, not to her eternal and fundamental laws) constitute Physics. And to these let there be subordinate two practical divisions: to Physics, Mechanics; to Metaphysics, what (in a purer sense of the word) I call Magic, on account of the broadness of the ways it moves in, and its greater command over nature.

=== Biology ===
Explanations in terms of final causes remain common in evolutionary biology. Francisco J. Ayala has claimed that teleology is indispensable to biology since the concept of adaptation is inherently teleological. In an appreciation of Charles Darwin published in Nature in 1874, Asa Gray noted "Darwin's great service to Natural Science" lies in bringing back teleology "so that, instead of Morphology versus Teleology, we shall have Morphology wedded to Teleology." Darwin quickly responded, "What you say about Teleology pleases me especially and I do not think anyone else has ever noticed the point." Francis Darwin and T. H. Huxley reiterate this sentiment. The latter wrote that "the most remarkable service to the philosophy of Biology rendered by Mr. Darwin is the reconciliation of Teleology and Morphology, and the explanation of the facts of both, which his view offers." James G. Lennox states that Darwin uses the term 'Final Cause' consistently in his Species Notebook, On the Origin of Species, and after.

Contrary to Ayala's position, Ernst Mayr states that "adaptedness... is a posteriori result rather than an a priori goal-seeking." Various commentators view the teleological phrases used in modern evolutionary biology as a type of shorthand. For example, S. H. P. Madrell writes that "the proper but cumbersome way of describing change by evolutionary adaptation [may be] substituted by shorter overtly teleological statements" for the sake of saving space, but that this "should not be taken to imply that evolution proceeds by anything other than from mutations arising by chance, with those that impart an advantage being retained by natural selection." However, Lennox states that in evolution as conceived by Darwin, it is true both that evolution is the result of mutations arising by chance and that evolution is teleological in nature.

Statements that a species does something "in order to" achieve survival are teleological. The validity or invalidity of such statements depends on the species and the intention of the writer as to the meaning of the phrase "in order to." Sometimes it is possible or useful to rewrite such sentences so as to avoid teleology. Some biology courses have incorporated exercises requiring students to rephrase such sentences so that they do not read teleologically. Nevertheless, biologists still frequently write in a way which can be read as implying teleology even if that is not the intention.

=== Animal behaviour (Tinbergen's four questions) ===
Tinbergen's four questions, named after the ethologist Nikolaas Tinbergen and based on Aristotle's four causes, are complementary categories of explanations for animal behaviour. They are also commonly referred to as levels of analysis.

The four questions are on:

1. function, what an adaptation does that is selected for in evolution;
2. phylogeny, the evolutionary history of an organism, revealing its relationships to other species;
3. mechanism, namely the proximate cause of a behaviour, such as the role of testosterone in aggression; and
4. ontogeny, the development of an organism from egg to embryo to adult.

== Technology (Heidegger's four causes) ==
In The Question Concerning Technology, echoing Aristotle, Martin Heidegger describes the four causes as follows:

1. causa materialis: the material or matter
2. causa formalis: the form or shape the material or matter enters
3. causa finalis: the end
4. causa efficiens: the effect that brings about the finished result.

Heidegger explains that "[w]hoever builds a house or a ship or forges a sacrificial chalice reveals what is to be brought forth, according to the terms of the four modes of occasioning."

The educationist David Waddington comments that although the efficient cause, which he identifies as "the craftsman," might be thought the most significant of the four, in his view each of Heidegger's four causes is "equally co-responsible" for producing a craft item, in Heidegger's terms "bringing forth" the thing into existence. Waddington cites Lovitt's description of this bringing forth as "a unified process."

== History of statistics ==
Between the seventeenth and the nineteenth century, the statistics aimed to describe and govern the German state were organized along Aristotle's four categories:

Material cause describes territory and population. Formal cause brings together law, the constitution, legislation, and customs. Final cause has to do with the goals of the state: increasing the population, guaranteeing the national defense, modernizing agriculture, developing trade. And last, efficient cause gives account of the means available to the state: the administrative and political personnel, the judicial system, the general staff, and various elites.

== See also ==
- First cause
- Anthropic principle
- Biosemiotics
- Tinbergen's four questions
- Convergent evolution
- Five whys
- Four discourses, by Jacques Lacan
- Proximate and ultimate causation
- Socrates
- Teleology
- The purpose of a system is what it does
