= First article inspection =

Design verification process

A First Article Inspection (FAI) is a production validation process for verifying that a new or modified production process produces conforming parts that meet the manufacturing specification detailed in technical or engineering drawings. Typically, a supplier performs the FAI and the purchaser reviews the report. The FAI process usually consists of fully testing and inspecting either the first part produced by the new process or a sample from the first batch of parts. First article inspection is typically a purchase order requirement of the purchaser for the supplier to complete. If the manufacturer doesn't have the in-house capability or if the purchaser requests, the first article inspection may be conducted by an approved subcontract supplier such as a dimensional inspection/metrology laboratory.

Dimensional characteristics (size, shape, and feature location) are normally inspected using calibrated tools such as Coordinate Measuring Machines (CMMs), Vernier calipers, Go/no go gauges, etc. It may also be a requirement for material testing to be completed, checking the hardness, conductivity and other properties.

First article inspections are commonplace for military subcontractors. The protocol is, however, required for design verification, purchasing controls, from the supplier and the purchasers receiving inspection in many non-military industries, particularly aerospace, automotive and medical manufacturing.

Manufacturers delivering products to government bodies or in regulated industries such as medical device must typically meet more stringent requirements than international requirements. If there are special test requirements outside of the suppliers capability then test maybe subcontracted to a 3rd party accredited testing lab. This is normally called First Article Test and is a separate activity from FAI.

Some general standards which apply to first article inspection are produced by the ISO (International Organization for Standardization), the SAE AS (Society of Automotive Engineers Aerospace Standards), the IEC (International Electrotechnical Commission), the IAF (International Accreditation Forum) the ILAC (International Laboratory Accreditation Cooperation) however more stringent regulations may apply in the U.S. in regulated industries.

First article inspection can fulfill the process validation requirement of a quality management system such as ISO9001, EN9100, and AS9100. Within the Aerospace industry SAE AS9102 Aerospace First Article Inspection Requirement is used. This standard also supports the Aerospace Series – Requirements for Advanced Product Quality, Planning and Production Part Approval Process.

== Type ==
- To verify the accuracy of drawings and ensure that they reflect any changes made to parts design during the prototype design.
- To verify the production process in every parameter, rather than just concentrating on “critical” dimensions.
- To verify all tooling used to produce a part, to ensure that it is capable of producing parts to specifications.
- To verify the ability of the manufacturer to meet the needs of production.

== Enhanced first article inspections ==
With the use of modern computers in the manufacturing environment, first article inspections are no longer being used with the traditional three form layout on paper but instead recorded digitally and stored on servers for easy access and organization. Recording the first article digitally eliminates errors with the help of software that keeps track of the FAIs and generates reports immediately after successful completion of an FAI.

== By industry ==
=== Aviation and aerospace ===
AS9102 is the North American aerospace standard for First Article Inspection Requirements (like SJAC9102 for Japanese Aerospace Standards and EN9102 for European Aerospace Standards). First article inspection can be documented on Forms 1 (Part Number Accountability), 2 (Product Accountability), and 3 (Characteristic Accountability, Verification and Compatibility Evaluation).

Form 3 may often be referred to 3D data models or 2D technical data sheets (also called ballooned drawings), where the characterics are uniquely identified.

Some software solutions insert a grid on the 2D data sheets, so that the measured characteristics may be uniquely identified by the part number and the related revision number of the 2D data sheet, and the relative position of the characteristics on it (e.g.: in quarter A2, C10).

In a 3D data model, the point of each measured characteristics is uniquely identified by three numbers: the coordinate vector, that gives his Triangulation in a 3D space.

First Article Inspection is part of AS9145, Requirements for Advanced Product Quality Planning and Production Part Approval Process (APQP/PPAP), Phase 4 and is a required document for APQP/PPAP approval. See Production Part Approval Process.

Many large aerospace companies including Bombardier Aerospace, and Spirit AeroSystems have recently switched to enhanced first article inspections in order to keep track of the numerous first articles received by different companies within the company's supply chain. Suppliers to these companies, including Machine Shops, are also turning to enhanced first article inspections to improve manufacturing productivity and throughput by eliminating the manual process of creating FAIs. Customers who perform such inspections are recommended to identify this in the contract, and to use specific forms to document the results.
