= For want of a nail =

Proverb

Horseshoe nail

"For want of a nail" is a proverb, having numerous variations over several centuries, reminding that seemingly unimportant acts or omissions can have grave and unforeseen consequences through a domino effect.

== Background ==
Poet George Herbert included it in a 1640 collection of aphorisms as "For want of a naile the shoe is lost, for want of a shoe the horse is lost, for want of a horse the rider is lost." Benjamin Franklin, in his 1758 Poor Richard's Almanack, recorded a longer version:

For want of a nail the shoe was lost;
for want of a shoe the horse was lost;
and for want of a horse the rider was lost,
being overtaken and slain by the enemy,
all for want of care about a horse-shoe nail.

"The Want of a Nail" is a Philadelphia soul-influenced pop song by Todd Rundgren featuring Bobby Womack, released on his 1989 album Nearly Human. The track features a prominent brass section and gospel backing vocals, with lyrics based on the above poem and focusing on how small, missed details can lead to major, devastating consequences in relationships, reflecting the themes of the traditional proverb.

== History ==
The proverb is found in a number of forms.

Predecessors include the following:

- Middle High German (positively formulated): Diz ſagent uns die wîſen, ein nagel behalt ein îſen, ein îſen ein ros, ein ros ein man, ein man ein burc, der ſtrîten kan. ("The wise tell us that a nail keeps a shoe, a shoe a horse, a horse a man, a man a castle, that can fight.")
- For sparinge of a litel cost, Fulofte time a man hath lost, The large cote for the hod. ("For sparing a little cost often a man has lost the large coat for the hood.")
- Middle French: Par ung seul clou perd on ung bon cheval. (Modern French: Par seulement un clou, on perd un bon cheval.; English: "By just one nail one loses a good horse.") (c 1507 Jean Molinet, Faictz Dictz D., v768).
- "The French-men haue a military prouerbe; 'The losse of a nayle, the losse of an army'. The want of a nayle looseth the shooe, the losse of shooe troubles the horse, the horse indangereth the rider, the rider breaking his ranke molests the company, so farre as to hazard the whole Army". (1629 Thomas Adams (clergyman), "The Works of Thomas Adams: The Sum of His Sermons, Meditations, And Other Divine And Moral Discourses", p. 714")
