= Ishikawa diagram =

Causal diagrams created by Kaoru Ishikawa

An Ishikawa diagram

Ishikawa diagrams (also called fishbone diagrams, herringbone diagrams, cause-and-effect diagrams) are causal diagrams created by Kaoru Ishikawa that show the potential causes of a specific event.

Common uses of the Ishikawa diagram are product design and quality defect prevention to identify potential factors causing an overall effect. Each cause or reason for imperfection is a source of variation. Causes are usually grouped into major categories to identify and classify these sources of variation.

== Overview ==
Sample Ishikawa diagram shows the causes contributing to problem.

The defect, or the problem to be solved, is shown as the fish's head, facing to the right, with the causes extending to the left as fishbones; the ribs branch off the backbone for major causes, with sub-branches for root-causes, to as many levels as required.

Ishikawa diagrams were popularized in the 1960s by Kaoru Ishikawa, who pioneered quality management processes in the Kawasaki shipyards, and in the process became one of the founding fathers of modern management.

The basic concept was first used in the 1920s, and is considered one of the seven basic tools of quality control. It is known as a fishbone diagram because of its shape, similar to the side view of a fish skeleton.

Mazda Motors famously used an Ishikawa diagram in the development of the Miata (MX5) sports car.

== Root causes ==
An Ishikawa diagram breaking down possible root causes of a blurry photo

Root-cause analysis is intended to reveal key relationships among various variables, and the possible causes provide additional insight into process behavior. It shows high-level causes that lead to the problem encountered by providing a snapshot of the current situation.

There can be confusion about the relationships between problems, causes, symptoms and effects. Smith highlights this and the common question “Is that a problem or a symptom?” which mistakenly presumes that problems and symptoms are mutually exclusive categories. A problem is a situation that bears improvement; a symptom is the effect of a cause: a situation can be both a problem and a symptom.

At a practical level, a cause is whatever is responsible for, or explains, an effect - a factor "whose presence makes a critical difference to the occurrence of an outcome".

The causes emerge by analysis, often through brainstorming sessions, and are grouped into categories on the main branches off the fishbone. To help structure the approach, the categories are often selected from one of the common models shown below, but may emerge as something unique to the application in a specific case.

Each potential cause is traced back to find the root cause, often using the 5 Whys technique.

Typical categories include:

=== The 5 Ms (used in manufacturing) ===
Originating with lean manufacturing and the Toyota Production System, the 5 Ms is one of the most common frameworks for root-cause analysis:

- Manpower / Mindpower (physical or knowledge work, includes: kaizens, suggestions)
- Machine (equipment, technology)
- Material (includes raw material, consumables, and information)
- Method (process)
- Measurement / medium (inspection, environment)

These have been expanded by some to include an additional three, and are referred to as the 8 Ms:

- Mission / mother nature (purpose, environment)
- Management / money power (leadership)
- Maintenance

=== The 8 Ps (used in product marketing) ===
This common model for identifying crucial attributes for planning in product marketing is often also used in root-cause analysis as categories for the Ishikawa diagram:

- Product (or service)
- Price
- Place
- Promotion
- People (personnel)
- Process
- Physical evidence (proof)
- Performance

=== The 4 or 5 Ss (used in service industries) ===
An alternative used for service industries, uses four categories of possible cause:

- Surroundings: Refers to the environment in which the process occurs.
- Suppliers: Refers to external parties that provide inputs—raw materials, components, or services.
- Systems: Refers to the procedures, processes, and technologies used to perform the work.
- Skill: Refers to the human factor, particularly the knowledge and abilities of employees.
- Safety: Refers to physical and psychological well-being in the workplace.

== Use in specific industries ==
The Ishikawa diagram has been widely adopted across various industries as an effective tool for root cause analysis in quality, efficiency, and safety-related issues. Its versatility allows it to be applied in both manufacturing and service contexts.

In the manufacturing industry, particularly in the automotive and electronics sectors, the diagram is frequently used in continuous improvement initiatives such as Six Sigma and Lean Manufacturing. Quality teams use it to identify causes related to materials, methods, machinery, manpower, environment, and measurement, facilitating informed decision-making to reduce defects and optimize processes.

In the food industry, the Ishikawa diagram is applied to analyze issues related to food safety, temperature control, cross-contamination, and regulatory compliance. Its use enables companies to identify improvement opportunities in production, packaging, and distribution stages.

In the pharmaceutical sector, it is a key tool in process validation, quality control, and compliance with Good Manufacturing Practices (GMP). It helps visualize factors affecting product quality from formulation to storage.

It has also been successfully implemented in sectors such as aerospace, pulp and paper, construction, education, and healthcare, where it supports structured problem-solving and promotes continuous improvement and a culture of quality.

== See also ==
- Seven basic tools of quality
- Five whys
- Issue map
- Issue tree
- Resource management
- Why-because analysis
