= Descriptive research =

Used to describe characteristics of a phenomenon being studied

Descriptive research is used to describe characteristics of a population or phenomenon being studied. It does not answer questions about how/when/why the characteristics occurred. Rather it addresses the "what" question (what are the characteristics of the population or situation being studied?). The characteristics used to describe the situation or population are usually some kind of categorical scheme also known as descriptive categories. For example, the periodic table categorizes the elements. Scientists use knowledge about the nature of electrons, protons and neutrons to devise this categorical scheme. We now take for granted the periodic table, yet it took descriptive research to devise it. Descriptive research generally precedes explanatory research. For example, over time the periodic table's description of the elements allowed scientists to explain chemical reaction and make sound prediction when elements were combined.

Hence, descriptive research cannot describe what caused a situation. Thus, descriptive research cannot be used as the basis of a causal relationship, where one variable affects another. In other words, descriptive research can be said to have a low requirement for internal validity.

The description is used for frequencies, averages, and other statistical calculations. Often the best approach, prior to writing descriptive research, is to conduct a survey investigation. Qualitative research often has the aim of description and researchers may follow up with examinations of why the observations exist and what the implications of the findings are.

== Social science research ==
In addition, the conceptualizing of descriptive research (categorization or taxonomy) precedes the hypotheses of explanatory research. (For a discussion of how the underlying conceptualization of exploratory research, descriptive research and explanatory research fit together, see: Conceptual framework.)

Descriptive research can be statistical research. The main objective of this type of research is to describe the data and characteristics of what is being studied. The idea behind this type of research is to study frequencies, averages, and other statistical calculations. Although this research is highly accurate, it does not gather the causes behind a situation. Descriptive research is mainly done when a researcher wants to gain a better understanding of a topic. That is, analysis of the past as opposed to the future. Descriptive research is the exploration of the existing certain phenomena. The details of the facts won't be known. The existing phenomena's facts are not known to the person.

== Descriptive science ==
Descriptive science is a category of science that involves descriptive research; that is, observing, recording, describing, and classifying phenomena. Descriptive research is sometimes contrasted with hypothesis-driven research, which is focused on testing a particular hypothesis by means of experimentation.

David A. Grimaldi and Michael S. Engel suggest that descriptive science in biology is currently undervalued and misunderstood:

"Descriptive" in science is a pejorative, almost always preceded by "merely," and typically applied to the array of classical -ologies and -omies: anatomy, archaeology, astronomy, embryology, morphology, paleontology, taxonomy, botany, cartography, stratigraphy, and the various disciplines of zoology, to name a few. [...] First, an organism, object, or substance is not described in a vacuum, but rather in comparison with other organisms, objects, and substances. [...] Second, descriptive science is not necessarily low-tech science, and high tech is not necessarily better. [...] Finally, a theory is only as good as what it explains and the evidence (i.e., descriptions) that supports it.

A negative attitude by scientists toward descriptive science is not limited to biological disciplines: Lord Rutherford's notorious quote, "All science is either physics or stamp collecting," displays a clear negative attitude about descriptive science, and it is known that he was dismissive of astronomy, which at the beginning of the 20th century was still gathering largely descriptive data about stars, nebulae, and galaxies, and was only beginning to develop a satisfactory integration of these observations within the framework of physical law, a cornerstone of the philosophy of physics.

== Descriptive versus design sciences ==
Ilkka Niiniluoto has used the terms "descriptive sciences" and "design sciences" as an updated version of the distinction between basic and applied science. According to Niiniluoto, descriptive sciences are those that seek to describe reality, while design sciences seek useful knowledge for human activities.

== See also ==
- Methodology
- Normative science
- Procedural knowledge
- Scientific method
