= Elizabeth A. Barnes =

American climate scientist

- Occupations: Climate scientist, professor
- Writing career
- Subject: Artificial Intelligence for science
- Website: www.barnes-research.com

Elizabeth A. Barnes is an American climate scientist. Barnes is best known for her work and expertise on the use of statistical methods to understand the variability of Earth's short- and long-term climate. Her work is characterized by an integration of both physics and computer science approaches. She is a Fellow of the American Geophysical Union and the American Meteorological Society.

== Early life and education ==
Barnes grew up in Minnesota. She earned two bachelor's degrees, summa cum laude, at the University of Minnesota, where she studied mathematics and physics. She went on to earn a PhD in Atmospheric science from the University of Washington, where she specialized in eddy mean flow interactions of the midlatitude jet stream. Following her graduate studies, Barnes accepted a National Oceanic and Atmospheric Administration Climate and Global Change post-doctoral fellowship, located at the Lamont Doherty Earth Observatory at Columbia University.

== Research and career ==
While a post-doctoral fellow at Columbia University, Barnes led research that explored the relationship of ongoing anthropogenic climate change and Arctic amplification, changes to Northern Hemisphere circulation, and the future of extreme events

In 2013, Barnes joined the faculty of the Department of Atmospheric Science at Colorado State University. As of October 2022, Barnes had led or co-authored more than 115 scholarly journal articles. Notably, Barnes was an early adopter of machine-learning methods for understanding climate variability and change. This work has been recognized as "trustworthy, authoritative and expertly targeted to make real, concrete advances" in the understanding of the climate system.

In summer 2025, Barnes' group moved to Boston University where she now holds the Dalton Family Chair in Environmental Data Science and Sustainability and is a Professor of Computing & Data Sciences and Professor of Earth & Environment

Barnes' research lab has worked broadly in the field of climate science, including making major contributions to explainable artificial intelligence (XAI) for earth science, subseasonal-to-decadal predictability, climate intervention, climate change and sustainability, large-scale atmospheric dynamics, and causal discovery.

== Selected Awards and honours ==
- 2026 Fellow, American Meteorological Society
- 2025 Presidential Early Career Award for Scientists and Engineers (PECASE), The White House
- 2021 Macelwane Medal, American Geophysical Union
- 2021 Fellow, American Geophysical Union
- 2021 Faculty Excellence Award, College of Engineering, Colorado State University
- 2020 Turco Lectureship, American Geophysical Union
- 2020 Clarence Leroy Meisinger Award, American Meteorological Society
- 2018 CAREER Award, National Science Foundation
- 2016 George T. Abell Outstanding Early-Career Faculty Award
- 2016 Outstanding Professor of the Year, Department of Atmospheric Science, Colorado State University
- 2014 James R. Holton Junior Scientist Award, American Geophysical Union
