= Outline of scientific method =

Overview of and topical guide to scientific method

The following outline is provided as an overview of and topical guide to the scientific method:

Scientific method – body of techniques for investigating phenomena and acquiring new knowledge, as well as for correcting and integrating previous knowledge. It is based on observable, empirical, reproducible, measurable evidence, and subject to the laws of reasoning.

== Nature of scientific method ==
Scientific method

- Science
- Philosophy of science
- Sociology of knowledge
- Process of science
- Knowledge

== Elements of scientific method ==
Research

- Basic research

=== Observation ===
Observation

- Scientific method
- Causation
- Investigation
- Measurement (Outline of metrology and measurement)

=== Hypothesis ===
Hypothesis

- pro:Karl Popper
  - Falsifiability
- con:Paul Feyerabend
- Statistical hypothesis testing

=== Experiment ===
Experiment

- Laboratory
- Laboratory techniques
- Design of experiments
- Scientific control
- Natural experiment
- Observational study
- Field experiment
- Self-experimentation
  - Self-experimentation in medicine
- Placebo effect

=== Theory ===
- Scientific theory

==== Prediction ====
- Prediction
  - Bayesian inference – subjective use of statistical reasoning
  - Deductive reasoning
  - Retrodiction

=== Evaluation by scientific community ===
- Peer review
- Medical peer review

== Scientific method concepts ==
=== Empirical methods ===
Empirical methods

- Empiricism
- Robert Grosseteste
- Peter Parker
- Empirical validation
- Operationalization

=== Use of statistics ===
- Uncomfortable science — Inference from a limited sample of data
- Exploratory data analysis
- Confirmatory data analysis

=== Paradigm change ===
- Thomas Kuhn
  - The Structure of Scientific Revolutions
  - Paradigm
  - Paradigm shift

=== Problem of induction ===
The problem of induction questions the logical basis of scientific statements.

- Inductive reasoning appears to lie at the core of the scientific method, yet also appears to be invalid.
- David Hume was the person who first pointed out the problem of induction.
- Karl Popper offered one solution, Falsifiability

=== Scientific creativity ===
- Tacit knowledge

=== Deviations from the scientific method ===
- Junk science
- Pseudoscience
- Pathological science
- Fringe science

=== Critique of scientific method ===
- Paul Feyerabend argued that the search for a definitive scientific method was misplaced and even counterproductive.
- Imre Lakatos attempted to bridge the gap between Popper and Kuhn.
- Sociology of scientific knowledge
- Scientism

=== Relationship of scientific method to technology ===
- Science and technology studies
- Theories of technology

=== Aesthetics in the scientific method ===
- Elegance
- Occam's razor

== History of scientific method ==
=== Publications ===
- Ibn al-Haytham's Book of Optics
- Avicenna's The Canon of Medicine
- Roger Bacon's Opus Majus
- Francis Bacon's Novum Organum
- Isaac Newton's Philosophiæ Naturalis Principia Mathematica

=== Persons influential in the development of scientific method ===
- Alhazen
- Francis Bacon
- Galileo Galilei
- Isaac Newton
- René Descartes
- Charles Sanders Peirce

== See also ==
- Bayesian probability
  - Quasi-empirical methods
  - Foundation ontology
  - Ontology
  - Philosophy of mathematics
  - Mathematics
- Epistemology
  - Post-processual archaeology is a methodological curiosity from Archaeology.
  - Structuralism
    - Post-structuralism
    - Deconstruction
    - Postmodernism
    - Latour, Bruno
    - Secularism-
- Physical law
  - Science policy
  - Scientific Revolution
  - Sociology of knowledge
  - Science studies
