= Causal analysis =

Field of statistics

Causal analysis is the field of experimental design and statistics pertaining to establishing cause and effect. Typically it involves establishing four elements: correlation, sequence in time (that is, causes must occur before their proposed effect), a plausible physical or information-theoretical mechanism for an observed effect to follow from a possible cause, and eliminating the possibility of common and alternative ("special") causes. Such analysis usually involves one or more controlled or natural experiments.

== Motivation ==
Data analysis is primarily concerned with causal questions. For example, did the fertilizer cause the crops to grow? Or, can a given sickness be prevented? Or, why is my friend depressed? The potential outcomes and regression analysis techniques handle such queries when data is collected using designed experiments. Data collected in observational studies require different techniques for causal inference (because, for example, of issues such as confounding). Causal inference techniques used with experimental data require additional assumptions to produce reasonable inferences with observation data. The difficulty of causal inference under such circumstances is often summed up as "correlation does not imply causation".

== In philosophy and physics ==
The nature of causality is systematically investigated in several academic disciplines, including philosophy and physics. In academia, there are a significant number of theories on causality; The Oxford Handbook of Causation (Beebee, Hitchcock & Menzies 2009) encompasses 770 pages. Among the more influential theories within philosophy are Aristotle's Four causes and Al-Ghazali's occasionalism. David Hume argued that beliefs about causality are based on experience, and experience similarly based on the assumption that the future models the past, which in turn can only be based on experience – leading to circular logic. In conclusion, he asserted that causality is not based on actual reasoning: only correlation can actually be perceived. Immanuel Kant, according to Beebee, Hitchcock & Menzies (2009), held that "a causal principle according to which every event has a cause, or follows according to a causal law, cannot be established through induction as a purely empirical claim, since it would then lack strict universality, or necessity".

Outside the field of philosophy, theories of causation can be identified in classical mechanics, statistical mechanics, quantum mechanics, spacetime theories, biology, social sciences, and law. To establish a correlation as causal within physics, it is normally understood that the cause and the effect must connect through a local mechanism (cf. for instance the concept of impact) or a nonlocal mechanism (cf. the concept of field), in accordance with known laws of nature. From the point of view of thermodynamics, universal properties of causes as compared to effects have been identified through the Second law of thermodynamics, confirming the ancient, medieval and Cartesian view that "the cause is greater than the effect" for the particular case of thermodynamic free energy. This, in turn, is challenged by popular interpretations of the concepts of nonlinear systems and the butterfly effect, in which small events cause large effects due to, respectively, unpredictability and an unlikely triggering of large amounts of potential energy.

=== Causality construed from counterfactual states ===
Intuitively, causation seems to require not just a correlation, but a counterfactual dependence. Suppose that a student performed poorly on a test and guesses that the cause was his not studying. To prove this, one thinks of the counterfactual – the same student writing the same test under the same circumstances but having studied the night before. If one could rewind history, and change only one small thing (making the student study for the exam), then causation could be observed (by comparing version 1 to version 2). Because one cannot rewind history and replay events after making small controlled changes, causation can only be inferred, never exactly known. This is referred to as the Fundamental Problem of Causal Inference – it is impossible to directly observe causal effects.

A major goal of scientific experiments and statistical methods is to approximate as best possible the counterfactual state of the world. For example, one could run an experiment on identical twins who were known to consistently get the same grades on their tests. One twin is sent to study for six hours while the other is sent to the amusement park. If their test scores suddenly diverged by a large degree, this would be strong evidence that studying (or going to the amusement park) had a causal effect on test scores. In this case, correlation between studying and test scores would almost certainly imply causation.

Well-designed experimental studies replace equality of individuals as in the previous example by equality of groups. The objective is to construct two groups that are similar except for the treatment that the groups receive. This is achieved by selecting subjects from a single population and randomly assigning them to two or more groups. The likelihood of the groups behaving similarly to one another (on average) rises with the number of subjects in each group. If the groups are essentially equivalent except for the treatment they receive, and a difference in the outcome for the groups is observed, then this constitutes evidence that the treatment is responsible for the outcome, or in other words the treatment causes the observed effect. However, an observed effect could also be caused "by chance", for example as a result of random perturbations in the population. Statistical tests exist to quantify the likelihood of erroneously concluding that an observed difference exists when in fact it does not (for example see P-value).

== Operational definitions of causality ==
Clive Granger created the first operational definition of causality in 1969. Granger made the definition of probabilistic causality proposed by Norbert Wiener operational as a comparison of variances.

== Verification by "truth" ==
Peter Spirtes, Clark Glymour, and Richard Scheines introduced the idea of explicitly not providing a definition of causality. Spirtes and Glymour introduced the PC algorithm for causal discovery in 1990. Many recent causal discovery algorithms follow the Spirtes-Glymour approach to verification.

== Exploratory ==
Exploratory causal analysis, also known as "data causality" or "causal discovery" is the use of statistical algorithms to infer associations in observed data sets that are potentially causal under strict assumptions. ECA is a type of causal inference distinct from causal modeling and treatment effects in randomized controlled trials. It is exploratory research usually preceding more formal causal research in the same way exploratory data analysis often precedes statistical hypothesis testing in data analysis.

== See also ==
- Causal inference
- Causal model
- Causality
- Causal reasoning
