= Bold hypothesis =

Concept in the philosophy of science

Bold hypothesis (or bold conjecture, the terms are used interchangeably) is a concept originally created by the liberal philosopher Karl Popper when he tried to define the meaning of scientific thinking and scientific progress. It was first explained in his debut The Logic of Scientific Discovery (1935) and subsequently elaborated in writings such as Conjectures and Refutations: The Growth of Scientific Knowledge (1963), Objective knowledge: an evolutionary approach (1972), and Replies to my critics (1974). In successive texts written in the course of four decades, Popper added some nuances to the definition of the concept.

Broadly speaking, the idea of a bold hypothesis refers to a new, testable theoretical proposition (or theoretical claim) made within a subject area which, if it is true, would be able to explain and predict much more about the subject than was previously possible. It would significantly alter existing scientific understandings about the subject, in a positive way. The new idea would be very useful for scientific research about the subject. This contrasts with other types of scientific claims which, if they turn out to be true, make little difference to what scientists already know about the subject. The contrary of a bold hypothesis is an "ad hoc hypothesis" which protects a well-established scientific theory from refutation, by means of some convenient modification of this theory which has no new testable consequences. Alan F. Chalmers summarizes that, in Popper's philosophy of science,

"A very good theory will be one that makes very wideranging claims about the world, and which is consequently highly falsifiable, and is one that resists falsification whenever it is put to the test."

The idea of a "bold hypothesis" is nowadays widely used in the philosophy of science and in the philosophy of knowledge. It is also used in the social, historical and physical sciences, to refer to "significant new ways to understand something". Bold hypotheses are often understood to be an important ingredient of major scientific breakthroughs, scientific progress and scientific innovation. Bold hypotheses can help to move scientific understanding forward, by creating new concepts and formulations to understand something and testing them out. That is also why bold hypotheses have an important place in Karl Popper's theory of scientific progress.

However, when bold hypotheses are formulated, they don't necessarily meet all the scientific criteria required to test them yet. And not all of them survive the scientific tests that are eventually done. Some hypotheses stand up to the evidence, while others do not. Testing a bold hypothesis conclusively can be difficult. It can sometimes take a long time, before a bold hypothesis is definitely accepted or rejected. There are also bold hypotheses which, although they were ultimately rejected after relevant tests, nevertheless triggered a lot of new and valuable ideas about what might (or might not) be the case. They might help to rule out a lot of possibilities, and focus the research with new leads. Sometimes it is helpful to know what cannot be true, in order to find out what is true.

== Brief explanation ==
Karl Popper's argument was that scientific progress occurs through formulating bold hypotheses, and trying to refute (disprove or falsify) them. Popper believed that:

"The advance of science is not due to the fact that more and more perceptual experiences accumulate in the course of time. Nor is it due to the fact that we are making ever better use of our senses. Out of uninterpreted sense-experiences science cannot be distilled, no matter how industriously we gather and sort them. Bold ideas, unjustified anticipations, and speculative thought, are our only means for interpreting nature: our only organon, our only instrument, for grasping her. And we must hazard them to win our prize. Those among us who are unwilling to expose their ideas to the hazard of refutation do not take part in the scientific game."

He makes this point more specific in a 1953 lecture, where he argues that, if we aim to explain the world, then:

"... there is no more rational procedure than the method of trial and error – of conjecture and refutation: of boldly proposing theories; of trying our best to show that these are erroneous; and of accepting them tentatively if our critical efforts are unsuccessful. From the point of view here developed, all laws, all theories, remain essentially tentative, or conjectural, or hypothetical, even when we feel unable to doubt them any longer."

In his 1974 reply to critics, Popper described the concept of bold hypotheses some more:

“Bold ideas are new, daring, hypotheses or conjectures. And severe attempts at refutations are severe critical discussions and severe empirical tests. When is a conjecture daring and when is it not daring, in the sense here proposed? Answer: it is daring if and only if it takes a great risk of being false – if matters could be otherwise, and seem at the time to be otherwise.”

He added that the characteristic of bold conjectures, in combination with tests and refutations, is what distinguishes science from non-science, from prescientific myths and from metaphysics:

”There is a reality behind the world as it appears to us, possibly a many-layered reality, of which the appearances are the outermost layers. What the great scientist does is boldly to guess, daringly to conjecture, what these inner realities are like. (…) The boldness can be gauged by the distance between the world of appearance and the conjectured reality, the explanatory hypotheses. But there is another, a special kind of boldness – the boldness of predicting aspects of the world of appearance which so far have been overlooked but which it must possess if the conjectured reality is (more or less) right, if the explanatory hypotheses are (approximately) true. It is this more special kind of boldness which I have usually in mind when I speak of bold scientific conjectures. It is the boldness of a conjecture which takes a real risk – the risk of being tested and refuted; the risk of clashing with reality. Thus my proposal was, and is, that it is this second boldness, together with the readiness to look out for tests and refutations, which distinguishes “empirical” science from nonscience, and especially from prescientific myths and metaphysics.”

This passage makes it very clear, that the idea of bold hypotheses also has a central role in Popper's solution for the demarcation problem, i.e. the problem of how scientific knowledge and scientific practice can be distinguished from non-scientific beliefs and practices.

=== Defining the boldness of hypotheses ===
A "bold" hypothesis is a new scientific idea which, if it was true, would be able to predict and/or explain a lot, or a lot more, about the subject being theorized about. The "boldness" of a scientific hypothesis can be evaluated with the following criteria:

1. Testability: the degree to which the hypothesis can be comprehensively tested (or, the extent to which the hypothesis can be definitely proved right or wrong, with available scientific methods).
2. Risk: the likelihood that the hypothesis which is to be tested will turn out to be wrong when tests are carried out.
3. Novelty: the extent to which the hypothesis represents a genuinely new departure from what scientists already know from established scientific ideas (or compared to background knowledge).
4. Heuristic power: whether the hypothesis stimulates new, innovative research that goes beyond the conventional or established approaches.
5. Predictive power: whether the hypothesis enables genuinely new and better predictions involving new phenomena (or forecasts which are not trivial), if the hypothesis is true.
6. Scientific impact: whether the hypothesis would have a major impact on existing scientific thinking, if it is true (or, how much it could change scientific thinking or scientific theory).
7. Explanatory power/depth: the scope or reach of the hypothesis – the size, number and variety of phenomena which it would explain, if it is true.

=== Testing hypotheses ===
Once a bold hypothesis has been mooted, Popper argues, scientists try to investigate and test how well the bold hypothesis can stand up to the known evidence. They try to find counter-arguments that would refute or falsify the bold hypothesis. In this process of testing and criticism, new scientific knowledge is generated. Even if the bold hypothesis turns out to have been wrong, testing it may well generate useful knowledge about what can and cannot be the case. Often it stimulates new research.

Inversely, if a hypothesis lacks the quality of boldness, then it would make very little difference to what scientists already know. It is not "a big deal", i.e. it is not very significant for the knowledge which exists already. It contributes little to advancing scientific progress, because it does not expand or add anything much to scientific understanding.

=== Tentative knowledge ===
According to Popper,

"Science does not rest upon solid bedrock. The bold structure of its theories rises, as it were, above a swamp. It is like a building erected on piles. The piles are driven down from above into the swamp, but not down to any natural or ‘given’ base; and if we stop driving the piles deeper, it is not because we have reached firm ground. We simply stop when we are satisfied that the piles are firm enough to carry the structure, at least for the time being." "

In one of his later writings, Objective Knowledge (1972), Popper argued that:

"A theory is the bolder the greater its content. It is also the riskier: it is the more probable to start with that it will be false. We try to find its weak points, to refute it. If we fail to refute it, or if the refutations we find are at the same time also refutations of the weaker theory which was its predecessor, then we have reason to suspect, or to conjecture, that the stronger theory has no greater falsity content than its weaker predecessor, and, therefore, that it has the greater degree of verisimilitude".

This interpretation was criticized by Adolf Grünbaum.

== Main criticisms ==
Popper's idea of the role of bold hypotheses in scientific progress has attracted four main kinds of criticisms. These concern (1) the meaning of "boldness", (2) the issue of testability, (3) the issue of falsifiability, and (4) the realities of normal science.

=== Boldness issue ===
The idea of a bold hypothesis is itself somewhat fuzzy, because exactly "how bold is bold" in scientific boldness?

1. Is boldness always a good thing in scientific hypothesizing? How we assess the degree of boldness may just be a subjective matter (it may depends on how you care to look at it).
2. Some new ideas, although they are rather modest in themselves, can make a very large difference to the advancement of scientific research.
3. At a more concrete level, the degree of "boldness" could refer (i) to the content of the hypothesis (considered relative to other possible hypotheses), or (ii) to the manner or context in which the hypothesis is presented, (iii) to its expected importance for research, or (iv) to the attitude involved. The degree of boldness could be downplayed for the sake of credibility or compatibility with established ideas, or it could be exaggerated to create the image of a "big scientific breakthrough" (to obtain research funding).
4. The timing of the evaluation of a hypothesis is also important: a hypothesis which does not seem "bold" right now, could be judged "very bold" later, when historians know much more about the full impact it turned out to have (and vice versa). Alan F. Chalmers comments that “What rates as a bold conjecture at one stage in the history of science may no longer be bold at some later stage.” Scientists may not know in advance exactly how bold a hypothesis actually is, even if they know it is a very new idea. The degree of "boldness" of a new hypothesis may be admitted only in the light of a rational reconstruction of the history of a science. A truth discovered at the margins of society may later go mainstream, and eventually become accepted by most people, although that was not foreseen when the discovery was made. Inversely, a hypothesis which seemed really bold at the time it was first mooted, can later appear to have been "not such a big deal".
5. A fashionable scientist with a lot of sponsors might be presented as doing new and bold things, while in reality it was more hype than substance.

So it remains somewhat fuzzy what kinds of criteria or relativizations we might use, to credit new hypotheses as "bold" or not. There could be an element of propaganda in the "boldness" attributed to a scientific idea.

=== Testability issue ===
In Popper's philosophy of science, scientific statements are always provisional, they have limits of application, and they could always be wrong. If a statement cannot even in principle be proved wrong, it cannot be a scientific statement. Thus, in Popper's eyes, the falsifiability criterion clearly demarcates "science" from "non-science".

This Popperian idea has been very controversial, however. The reason is that it can be quite difficult to test scientifically how true a particular idea is. Even if scientists do want to test an idea, they may not know yet how exactly to test it conclusively. Yet, scientists also don't want to abandon a hunch that seems useful, simply because they don't know how to verify it yet. This point is especially important for "bold" new hypotheses, because the very "boldness" of the new hypothesis could mean that it would take a lot of work before adequate tests could be designed and carried out.

Some philosophers have argued that, in the real world, scientists operate routinely with at least some metaphysical beliefs for which they have no proof or verification whatsoever. In fact, in The logic of scientific discovery, Karl Popper admits that this is the case:

“I do not… go so far as to assert that metaphysics has no value for empirical science. (…) looking at the matter from the psychological angle, I am inclined to think that scientific discovery is impossible without faith in ideas which are of a purely speculative kind, and sometimes even quite hazy; a faith which is completely unwarranted from the point of view of science, and which, to that extent, is ‘metaphysical’.”

Nevertheless Popper considered it his task to formulate a logical model of the method of empirical science, in which psychological factors or speculative/metaphysical thought play no role.

According to Paul Feyerabend, the creative processes that lead to a scientific discovery are usually quite reasonable and non-arbitrary. However, the creative processes are by no means fully "rational", and they can be quite unique. Therefore, he argued, the idea that there is one standard model which can define the rationality of all scientific methods should be rejected. This contrasts with Karl Popper's view that "Just as chess might be defined by the rules proper to it, so empirical science may be defined by means of its methodological rules".

=== Falsifiability issue ===
The philosopher Imre Lakatos argued (against Karl Popper's interpretation) that scientists do not aim to test bold hypotheses in order to falsify them; instead, scientists aim mainly to confirm hypotheses.

- A falsified conjecture shows the scientist only "what he does not know" or what cannot be the case. However, in reality scientists are more interested in knowing what is the case, and what they can know. That is, scientists are interested mainly in gaining positive new knowledge, which can be used for practical purposes. Scientists are not primarily interested in “knowing that they don't know things”, or in "knowing what is not the case" (other than to rule out possibilities). Scientists want to know what really is the case. Scientific statements according to this Lakatosian perspective are not falsifiable statements, as Karl Popper claimed, but fallible statements. There is an important difference. Falsifiable ideas are testable ideas which can be definitely proved to be false. Fallible statements are testable statements that could be wrong. Fallible statements include both testable propositions and statements of which it is known that they could be wrong, although currently we do not know how to test them yet for their truth or falsity (or, the possible tests are technically not yet feasible).
- According to Lakatos, all scientific statements are in reality fallible hypotheses, which scientists at the very least intend or aim to test for their truth-content. This contrasts with metaphysical ideas which are by their very nature not scientifically testable (one can only believe them, or not). In this respect Lakatos and Popper agree. Contrary to Popper's philosophy, however, Lakatos did not regard scientific progress simply as a "trial and error" process, "the bolder the better". It is certainly true that scientists must try things out, and that they can get it wrong. But not just "anything goes"; scientific research is guided by definite "do's and don'ts" learnt from experience, which Lakatos calls "positive heuristics" and "negative heuristics". These heuristics provide guidance for the path of a research programme, by suggesting strategies which are more likely to obtain good results, and strategies which are unlikely to get results.
- Lakatos believed Popper's philosophy was inconsistent, because Popper claimed that "definitive falsification" is possible, while also claiming at the same time that "absolute positive proof" of a hypothesis is impossible. In Lakatos's view of science, neither of these claims is actually true. There exist no "crucial experiments" which can either prove or disprove a hypothesis conclusively for all time. We can rarely be absolutely certain about (1) the extent to which the results of tests for a hypothesis show the true nature of objective reality, and (2) the extent to which the results are caused by the design of the tests themselves (due to aspects of the experimental design or research assumptions). All that really happens, Lakatos argues, is that scientists decide to accept the results of important or comprehensive tests as definitive "for all intents and purposes", although, in principle, that methodological decision could later on still be overturned. For example, it happens sometimes that the FDA or EFSA approves the sale of a foodstuff or a medicine after scientific tests, but later reverses the decision, in the light of more or newer tests (the product is taken out of the market). According to this Lakatosian interpretation, the results of scientific tests are never the "absolute or final truth", or "absolute true knowledge", and they always retain a fallible status - they could in principle always be proved wrong later, through renewed tests inspired by new theories. Popper admitted that this is the case, but according to Lakatos, he did not fully think through the implication, i.e. that absolute falsification of a theoretical proposition is strictly speaking impossible (even if, for all intents and purposes, scientists consider it to have been definitely refuted).

== Glamour versus "normal" science ==
Thomas Kuhn argued that Popper's interpretation does not provide a very realistic picture of what most scientists actually do, most of the time. He argued that Popper focused on the “glamorous” side of scientific work in the "revolutionary" episodes of a science, when old solutions are questioned and are not effective anymore, and radically new approaches are being tried out. In Popper's own words, “It is the working of great scientists that I have in my mind as my paradigm for science”. In much, if not most, scientific work in the real world, Kuhn claims, scientists are not mooting bold hypotheses that could overturn established views. Instead, they are working patiently on systematic, detailed tests of a small facet of a much larger theory or research paradigm; Kuhn called this practice "normal science". Thus, scientific progress may come about, not because somebody has a grandiose new idea, but instead because the careful testing of the details of a theory eventually provides definitive scientific conclusions that are generally accepted.

== Continuing relevance ==
Despite these important criticisms, Popper's concept of bold hypotheses continues to be widely used in the academic world. One reason is that, at some level, the concept does make sense, even if (arguably) Popper himself failed to define its role in scientific research very well. Another reason is that academic progress always requires that a scholar does something genuinely new and "breaks new ground". If a scholar only concerns themself with tiny, uncontroversial and fairly trivial claims, they are unlikely to be rewarded very much for their effort. Plausible and credible bold hypotheses are highly valued in the academic world, so long as they are reasonably consistent with (or cohere with) well-established scientific findings, and do not seriously challenge scientific authority.

In the business community, too, innovation is very important, to find new ways to reduce costs, increase productivity and sales, and raise profits. A bold new idea can be worth a lot of money, and therefore, business people are often sympathetic to bold attempts to reframe what is known already and to create new ideas; without such innovations, they would eventually be defeated by competitors who have a better idea. So the idea of a bold hypothesis also continues to have a place in economics, management theory and business administration.

== See also ==
- Ad hoc hypothesis
- Courage
- Creativity
- Critical rationalism
- Criticism
- Criticism of science
- Criticisms of anti-scientific viewpoints
- Discovery (observation)
- Epistemology
- Experiment
- Fallibilism
- Falsifiability
- Growth of knowledge
- Hypothesis
- Normal science
- Occam's razor
- Outline of scientific method
- Philosophy of science
- Problem of induction
- Pseudoscience
- Scientific method
- Scientific progress
- Scientific theory
- Testability
- Varieties of criticism
- Verifiability (science)
- Verisimilitude
