= Working hypothesis =

Provisional version pending further research

A working hypothesis is a hypothesis that is provisionally accepted as a basis for further ongoing research in the hope that a tenable theory will be produced, even if the hypothesis ultimately fails. Like all hypotheses, a working hypothesis is constructed as a statement of expectations, which can be linked to deductive, exploratory research in empirical investigation and is often used as a conceptual framework in qualitative research. The term "working" indicates that the hypothesis is subject to change.

== History ==
Use of the phrase "working hypothesis" goes back to at least the 1850s.

Charles Sanders Peirce came to hold that an explanatory hypothesis is not only justifiable as a tentative conclusion by its plausibility (by which he meant its naturalness and economy of explanation), but also justifiable as a starting point by the broader promise that the hypothesis holds for research. This idea of justifying a hypothesis as potentially fruitful (at the level of research method), not merely as plausible (at the level of logical conclusions), is essential for the idea of a working hypothesis, as later elaborated by Peirce's fellow pragmatist John Dewey.

In 1890, and again in 1897, Thomas Chrowder Chamberlin wrote "The method of multiple working hypotheses", in which he advocated the importance of simultaneously evaluating several hypotheses, rejecting those that conflict with available data, and ending with the one hypothesis supported by the data. This stood in contrast to what he called the single ruling theory, which encouraged scientists to find supporting data and not challenge it with difficult tests. The paper is considered a landmark on the scientific method, was an inspiration for the approach called strong inference, and was reprinted in 1965.

Peirce held that, as a matter of research method, an explanatory hypothesis is judged and selected for research because it offers to economize and expedite the process of inquiry, by being testable and by further factors in the economy of hypotheses: low cost, intrinsic value (instinctive naturalness and reasoned likelihood), and relations (caution, breadth, and incomplexity) among hypotheses, inquiries, etc. (as in the game of Twenty Questions). The Century Dictionary Supplement definition of "working hypothesis" reflects that perspective; Peirce may or may not have written it. Peirce seldom used the phrase "working hypothesis," but he once commented about a related kind of a hypothesis that it was "a hypothesis, which like the working hypothesis of a scientific inquiry, we may not believe to be altogether true, but which is useful in enabling us to conceive of what takes place." For Peirce the pragmatist, conceiving pragmatically of something meant conceiving of its effects in their conceivable implications as to informed practice in general including research.

John Dewey used the concept of the working hypothesis as a pivotal feature in his theory of inquiry. Contrary to the principles of verification and falsifiability, used in formal hypothesis testing found within dominant paradigms of 'normal' science, working hypotheses were conceived by Dewey as neither true nor false but "provisional, working means of advancing investigation," which lead to the discovery of other unforeseen but "relevant" facts. Dewey's development of the concept of the working hypothesis emerged from his contextualist epistemology in which absolute truth is unobtainable and replaced by "warranted assertability". Thus, Dewey noted:

The history of science also shows that when hypotheses have been taken to be finally true and hence unquestionable, they have obstructed inquiry and kept science committed to doctrines that later turned out to be invalid.

In Dewey's view, the working hypothesis is generated, not directly as a testable statement, but instead in order to "direct inquiry into channels in which new material, factual and conceptual, is disclosed, material which is more relevant, more weighted and confirmed, more fruitful, than were the initial facts and conceptions which served as the point of departure".

Abraham Kaplan later described the working hypothesis as "provisional or loosely formatted" theory or constructs.

== Design ==
Working hypotheses are constructed to facilitate inquiry; however, formal hypotheses can often be constructed based on the results of the inquiry, which in turn allows for the design of specific experiments whose data will either support or fail to support the formal hypotheses. In "Unity of Science as a Working Hypothesis" Oppenheim and Putnam (1958) argued that unitary science, in which laws from one branch could be equally useful by others, could only be accepted tentatively without further empirical testing. Thus they argued:

We therefore think the assumption that unitary science can be attained through cumulative micro-reduction recommends itself as a working hypothesis. That is, we believe that it is in accord with the standards of reasonable scientific judgment to tentatively accept this hypothesis and to work on the assumption that further progress can be made in this direction.

In "The Working Hypothesis in Social Reform" George Herbert Mead (1899) takes a macro position and applies the notion of a working hypothesis to social reform.

In the social world we must recognize the working hypothesis as the form into which all theories must be cast as completely as in the natural sciences. The highest criterion that we can present is that the hypothesis shall work in the complex of forces into which we introduce it" (p. 369).

Mead (1899) also expresses the tentative or provisional nature of working hypotheses.

Given its success (the working hypothesis), he (the social scientist) may restate his world from this standpoint and get the basis for further investigation that again always takes the form of a problem. The solution of this problem is found over again in the possibility of fitting his hypothetical proposition into the whole within which it arises. And he must recognize that this statement is only a working hypothesis at the best, i.e., he knows that further investigation will show that the former statement of his world is only provisionally true, and must be false from the standpoint of a larger knowledge, as every partial truth is necessarily false over against the fuller knowledge which he will gain later (p. 370).

For Putnam, the working hypothesis represents a practical starting point in the design of an empirical research exploration. A contrasting example of this conception of the working hypothesis is illustrated by the brain-in-a-vat thought experiment. This experiment involves confronting the global skeptic position that we, in fact, are all just brains in vats being stimulated by a mad scientist to believe that our reality is real. Putnam argued that this proposition, however, rests on a "magical theory of reference" in which the existential evidence necessary to validate it is assumed. Thus, the brain-in-a-vat proposition does not make for much of a hypothesis at all since there is no means to verify its truth. It does, however, provide a contrast for what a good working hypothesis would look like: one suited to culling potential existential evidence of the subject at hand.

A more concrete example would be that of conjectures in mathematics – propositions which appear to be true but which are formally unproven. Very often, conjectures will be provisionally accepted as working hypotheses in order to investigate its consequences and formulate conditional proofs.

Materials scientists Hosono et al. (1996) developed a working hypothesis about the nature of optically transparent and electrically conducting amorphous oxides. This exploratory study evaluated the hypothesis's effectiveness using confirming examples (p. 169).

== Application ==
In the field of public administration working hypotheses are used as a conceptual framework for exploratory, applied, empirical research. Research projects that use working hypotheses use a deductive reasoning or logic of inquiry. In other words, the problem and preliminary theory are developed ahead of time and tested using evidence. Working hypotheses (statements of expectation) are flexible and incorporate relational or non-relational statements. They are often used as ways to investigate a problem in a particular city or public agency.

These projects are a type of case study and use multiple methods of evidence collection. The working hypotheses are used as a device to direct evidence collection. As a result, working hypotheses are generally organized using sub-hypotheses, which specify in more detail the kinds of data or evidence needed to support the hypothesis.

== See also ==
- Analysis of competing hypotheses
- Conceptual framework
- Contextualism
- Einstellung effect (use)
- Exploratory research
- Falsifiability
- "Further research is needed"
- Inquiry
- Logical positivism
- Philosophy of science
- Pragmatism
- Thomas Kuhn
