= Hypothesis Theory =

Hypothesis Theory is a psychological theory of learning developed during the 1960s and 1970s. This theory played an important role in early research on conceptual learning by emphasizing how learners actively make and change rules rather than rely on associative mechanisms. The hypotheses theory also influenced understanding development changes in children's ability to support hypotheses during learning tasks. The major components of the theory include its experimental framework, formal modelling approaches, and influence of cognitive psychology.

== Experimental Framework ==
In the basic experimental framework, the subject is presented with a series of multidimensional stimuli and provided feedback about the class of the stimulus on each trial. (Two class problems are typical.) The framework is thus in many ways similar to that of concept learning.

In contrast to earlier association-type theories, the Hypothesis Theory argues that subjects solve this problem (i.e., learn the correct response to each stimulus), by testing a series of hypotheses about the relation of the cue values (stimulus features) to the class. For example, a candidate hypothesis for stimuli that vary along the three dimensions of shape, color, and size might be

$$\{\mathbf{Shape}=square, \mathbf{Color}=blue, \mathbf{Size}=small\} \Longrightarrow \; \{\mathbf{Class}=good\}$$

Because the subject is proposed to learn through the successive testing of hypotheses, the rate of learning should be highly dependent on the order in which hypotheses are tested, and on the particular hypotheses which are available to the learner. (It is conceivable that a given learner may not be able to formulate the hypothesis that would correctly classify the stimuli.) It is argued that as a result of the feature, Hypothesis theory can account for instances of poor learning that occur in some cases even when the statistical associational strength is high (Levine 1971).

Comparative overviews of perceptual theories have also described hypothesis testing as a strategy that is different from others models that are based on automatic similarity judgements (Elsevier, 2006) . These perceptual theories contrast with Hypothesis Theory by suggesting that classification can happen without conscious rule generation.

== Formal Theories ==
The process by which a subject is proposed to go about forming such rules or hypothesis has been the topic of formal probabilistic modeling, a discussion of which can be found in the references. A conceptual framework for formal probabilistic modeling of hypotheses in cognitive research has been given by Rudolf Groner

Tumblin and Gholson (1981) argued that formal models of testing helped clarify how learners judge rules and discard ineffective ones through multiple trails. Their analysis suggested that these formalizations gave insights into the underlyinh steps that involve multiple stimulus dimensions.

== Status of Research ==
Hypothesis theory has fallen out of favor (along with many other rule-based models) in the wake of prototype and exemplar theories, both of which employ a notion of graded similarity rather than crisp set membership. Although later prototypes became more effective, scholars have acknowledged that hypothesis theory laid the foundation for understanding explicit rule formation strategy.

Research centered on inkblots also showed that hypothesis testing processes can happen in ambiguous and less obvious ways, showing that the theory had even more relevance that goes beyond laboratory learning problems. This broadened the relevance of the theory beyond tightly controlled laboratory tasks and suggested that rule-testing strategies could be used in a wider range of cognitive situations.

Within that era hypothesis theory was known as an important step that helped bridge rule-based learning with cognitive approaches.

== See also ==
- For issues of knowledge (i.e., class) representability:
  - Rough sets
  - Probably approximately correct learning (PAC learning)
- Bold hypothesis

== Bibliography ==
- Levine, Marvin (1971). "Hypothesis theory and nonlearning despite ideal S–R-reinforcement contingencies". Psychological Review. 78 (2): 130–140. doi:10.1037/h0030647.
- Levine, Marvin (1975). A Cognitive Theory of Learning: Research on Hypothesis Testing. New York: John Wiley & Sons.
- Trabasso, Tom; Bower, Gordon H. (1968). Attention in Learning: Theory and Research. New York: John Wiley & Sons.
- Tumblin, A., & Gholson, B. (1981). Hypothesis theory and the development of conceptual learning. Psychological Bulletin, 90(1), 102–124. https://doi.org/10.1037/0033-2909.90.1.102
- PERCEPTION (II. COMPARATIVE APPRAISAL), THEORIES OF. (2006). In Elsevier’s Dictionary of Psychological Theories.
- Arthur G. Nikelly (1961) ‘Hypothesis’ Theory and Perceptual Responses to Inkblots, Journal of Projective Techniques, 25:1, 75-80, DOI: 10.1080/08853126.1961.10381009
