= Conceptual framework =

Method of organizing information

A conceptual framework is an analytical tool with several variations and contexts. It can be applied in different categories of work where an overall picture is needed. It is used to make conceptual distinctions and organize ideas. Strong conceptual frameworks capture something real and do this in a way that is easy to remember and apply.

== Examples ==
Isaiah Berlin used the metaphor of a "fox" and a "hedgehog" to make conceptual distinctions in how important philosophers and authors view the world. Berlin describes hedgehogs as those who use a single idea or organizing principle to view the world (such as Dante Alighieri, Blaise Pascal, Fyodor Dostoyevsky, Plato, Henrik Ibsen and Georg Wilhelm Friedrich Hegel). Foxes, on the other hand, incorporate a type of pluralism and view the world through multiple, sometimes conflicting, lenses (examples include Johann Wolfgang von Goethe, James Joyce, William Shakespeare, Aristotle, Herodotus, Molière, and Honoré de Balzac).

Economists use the conceptual framework of supply and demand to distinguish between the behavior and incentive systems of firms and consumers. Like many other conceptual frameworks, supply and demand can be presented through visual or graphical representations (see demand curve). Both political science and economics use principal agent theory as a conceptual framework. The politics-administration dichotomy is a long-standing conceptual framework used in public administration.

All three of these cases are examples of a macro-level conceptual framework.

== Overview ==
The use of the term conceptual framework crosses both scale (large and small theories) and contexts (social science, marketing, applied science, art etc.). The explicit definition of what a conceptual framework is and its application can therefore vary.

Conceptual frameworks are beneficial as organizing devices in empirical research. One set of scholars has applied the notion of a conceptual framework to deductive, empirical research at the micro- or individual study level. They employ American football plays as a useful metaphor to clarify the meaning of conceptual framework (used in the context of a deductive empirical study).

Likewise, conceptual frameworks are abstract representations, connected to the research project's goal that direct the collection and analysis of data (on the plane of observation – the ground). Critically, a football play is a "plan of action" tied to a particular, timely, purpose, usually summarized as long or short yardage. Shields and Rangarajan (2013) argue that it is this tie to "purpose" that makes American football plays such a good metaphor. They define a conceptual framework as "the way ideas are organized to achieve a research project's purpose". Like football plays, conceptual frameworks are connected to a research purpose or aim. Explanation is the most common type of research purpose employed in empirical research. The formal hypothesis of a scientific investigation is the framework associated with explanation.

Explanatory research usually focuses on "why" or "what caused" a phenomenon. Formal hypotheses posit possible explanations (answers to the why question) that are tested by collecting data and assessing the evidence (usually quantitative using statistical tests). For example, Kai Huang wanted to determine what factors contributed to residential fires in U.S. cities. Three factors were posited to influence residential fires. These factors (environment, population, and building characteristics) became the hypotheses or conceptual framework he used to achieve his purpose – explain factors that influenced home fires in U.S. cities.

== Types ==
Several types of conceptual frameworks have been identified, and line up with a research purpose in the following ways:

- Working hypothesis – exploration or exploratory research
- Pillar questions – exploration or exploratory research
- Descriptive categories – description or descriptive research
- Practical ideal type – gauging
- Models of operations research – decision making
- Formal hypothesis – explanation and prediction

Note that Shields and Rangarajan (2013) do not claim that the above is the only framework-purpose pairing. Nor do they claim the system is applicable to inductive forms of empirical research. Rather, the conceptual framework-research purpose pairings they propose are useful and provide new scholars a point of departure to develop their own research design.

Frameworks have also been used to explain conflict theory and the balance necessary to reach what amounts to a resolution. Within these conflict frameworks, visible and invisible variables function under concepts of relevance. Boundaries form and within these boundaries, tensions regarding laws and chaos (or freedom) are mitigated. These frameworks often function like cells, with sub-frameworks, stasis, evolution and revolution. Anomalies may exist without adequate "lenses" or "filters" to see them and may become visible only when the tools exist to define them.

== See also ==
- Analogy
- Conceptual model
- Inquiry
- Theory
