= Directed information =

Directed information is an information theory measure that quantifies the information flow from the random string $X^n = (X_1,X_2,\dots,X_n)$ to the random string $Y^n = (Y_1,Y_2,\dots,Y_n)$. The term directed information was coined by James Massey and is defined as

$$I(X^n\to Y^n) \triangleq \sum_{i=1}^n I(X^i;Y_i|Y^{i-1})$$

where $I(X^{i};Y_i|Y^{i-1})$ is the conditional mutual information $I(X_1,X_2,...,X_{i};Y_i|Y_1,Y_2,...,Y_{i-1})$.

Directed information has applications to problems where causality plays an important role such as the capacity of channels with feedback, capacity of discrete memoryless networks, capacity of networks with in-block memory, gambling with causal side information, compression with causal side information, real-time control communication settings, and statistical physics.

== Causal conditioning ==
The essence of directed information is causal conditioning. The probability of $x^n$ causally conditioned on $y^n$ is defined as

$$P(x^n||y^n) \triangleq \prod_{i=1}^n P(x_i|x^{i-1},y^{i})$$.

This is similar to the chain rule for conventional conditioning $P(x^n|y^n) = \prod_{i=1}^n P(x_i|x^{i-1},y^{n})$ except one conditions on "past" and "present" symbols $y^{i}$ rather than all symbols $y^{n}$. To include "past" symbols only, one can introduce a delay by prepending a constant symbol:

$$P(x^n||(0,y^{n-1})) \triangleq \prod_{i=1}^n P(x_i|x^{i-1},y^{i-1})$$.

It is common to abuse notation by writing $P(x^n||y^{n-1})$ for this expression, although formally all strings should have the same number of symbols.

One may also condition on multiple strings: $P(x^n||y^n,z^n) \triangleq \prod_{i=1}^n P(x_i|x^{i-1},y^{i},z^{i})$.

=== Causally conditioned entropy ===
The causally conditioned entropy is defined as:

$$H(X^n || Y^n)=\mathbf E\left[ -\log {P(X^n||Y^n)} \right]=\sum_{i=1}^n H(X_{i}|X^{i-1},Y^{i})$$

Similarly, one may causally condition on multiple strings and write $H(X^n || Y^n,Z^n)=\mathbf E\left[ -\log {P(X^n||Y^n,Z^n)} \right]$.

== Properties ==
A decomposition rule for causal conditioning is

$$P(x^n, y^n) = P(x^n||y^{n-1}) P(y^n||x^n)$$.

This rule shows that any product of $P(x^n||y^{n-1}), P(y^n||x^n)$ gives a joint distribution $P(x^n, y^n)$.

The causal conditioning probability$P(y^n||x^n) = \prod_{i=1}^n P(y_i|y^{i-1},x^{i})$ is a probability vector, i.e.,

$$P(y^n||x^n)\geq 0 \quad\text{and}\quad \sum_{y^n} P(y^n||x^n)=1 \quad\text{for all } (x^n,y^n)$$.

Directed Information can be written in terms of causal conditioning:

$$I(X^N \rightarrow Y^N)=\mathbf E\left[ \log \frac{P(Y^N||X^N)}{P(Y^N)} \right] = H(Y^n)- H(Y^n || X^n)$$.

The relation generalizes to three strings: the directed information flowing from $X^n$ to $Y^n$ causally conditioned on $Z^n$ is

$$I(X^n\to Y^n || Z^n) = H(Y^n || Z^n)- H(Y^n || X^n, Z^n)$$.

=== Conservation law of information ===
This law, established by James Massey and his son Peter Massey, gives intuition by relating directed information and mutual information. The law states that for any $X^n, Y^n$, the following equality holds:

$$I(X^n;Y^n)= I(X^n \to Y^n)+I(Y^{n-1} \to X^n).$$

Two alternative forms of this law are

$$I(X^n;Y^n) = I(X^n \to Y^n) + I(Y^n \to X^n) - I(X^n \leftrightarrow Y^n)$$
$$I(X^n;Y^n) = I(X^{n-1} \to Y^n) + I(Y^{n-1} \to X^n) + I(X^n \leftrightarrow Y^n)$$

where $I(X^n \leftrightarrow Y^n) = \sum_{i=1}^n I(X_i ; Y_i | X^{i-1}, Y^{i-1})$.

== Estimation and optimization ==
Estimating and optimizing the directed information is challenging because it has $n$ terms where $n$ may be large. In many cases, one is interested in optimizing the limiting average, that is, when $n$ grows to infinity termed as a multi-letter expression.

=== Estimation ===
Estimating directed information from samples is a hard problem since the directed information expression does not depend on samples but on the joint distribution $\{P(x_i,y_i|x^{i-1},y^{i-1})_{i=1}^n\}$ which may be unknown. There are several algorithms based on context tree weighting and empirical parametric distributions and using long short-term memory.

=== Optimization ===
Maximizing directed information is a fundamental problem in information theory. For example, given the channel distributions $\{P(y_i|x^{i},y^{i-1}\}_{i=1}^n)$, the objective might be to optimize $I(X^n\to Y^n)$ over the channel input distributions $\{P(x_i|x^{i-1},y^{i-1}\}_{i=1}^n)$.

There are algorithms to optimize the directed information based on the Blahut-Arimoto, Markov decision process, Recurrent neural network, Reinforcement learning. and Graphical methods (the Q-graphs). For the Blahut-Arimoto algorithm, the main idea is to start with the last mutual information of the directed information expression and go backward. For the Markov decision process, the main ideas is to transform the optimization into an infinite horizon average reward Markov decision process. For a Recurrent neural network, the main idea is to model the input distribution using a Recurrent neural network and optimize the parameters using Gradient descent. For Reinforcement learning, the main idea is to solve the Markov decision process formulation of the capacity using Reinforcement learning tools, which lets one deal with large or even continuous alphabets.

== Marko's theory of bidirectional communication ==
Massey's directed information was motivated by Marko's early work (1966) on developing a theory of bidirectional communication. Marko's definition of directed transinformation differs slightly from Massey's in that, at time $n$, one conditions on past symbols $X^{n-1},Y^{n-1}$ only and one takes limits:

$$T_{12} = \lim_{n \to \infty} \mathbf E\left[ -\log \frac{P(X_{n}|X^{n-1})}{P(X_{n}|X^{n-1},Y^{n-1})} \right] \quad\text{and}\quad T_{21} = \lim_{n \to \infty} \mathbf E\left[ -\log \frac{P(Y_{n}|Y^{n-1})}{P(Y_{n}|Y^{n-1},X^{n-1})} \right].$$

Marko defined several other quantities, including:

- Total information: $H_{1} = \lim_{n \to \infty} \mathbf E\left[ -\log P(X_{n}|X^{n-1}) \right]$ and $H_{2} = \lim_{n \to \infty} \mathbf E\left[ -\log P(Y_{n}|Y^{n-1}) \right]$
- Free information: $F_{1} = \lim_{n \to \infty} \mathbf E\left[ -\log P(X_{n}|X^{n-1},Y^{n-1}) \right]$ and $F_{2} = \lim_{n \to \infty} \mathbf E\left[ -\log P(Y_{n}|Y^{n-1},X^{n-1}) \right]$
- Coincidence: $K = \lim_{n \to \infty} \mathbf E\left[ -\log \frac{P(X_{n}|X^{n-1}) P(Y_{n}|Y^{n-1})}{P(X_{n},Y_{n}|X^{n-1},Y^{n-1})} \right].$

The total information is usually called an entropy rate. Marko showed the following relations for the problems he was interested in:

- $K = T_{12}+T_{21}$
- $H_{1} = T_{12}+F_{1}$ and $H_{2} = T_{21}+F_{2}$

He also defined quantities he called residual entropies:

- $R_{1} = H_{1}-K = F_{1}-T_{21}$
- $R_{2} = H_{2}-K = F_{2}-T_{12}$

and developed the conservation law $F_{1}+F_{2} = R_{1}+R_{2}+K = H_{1}+H_{2}-K$ and several bounds.

== Relation to transfer entropy ==
Directed information is related to transfer entropy, which is a truncated version of Marko's directed transinformation $T_{21}$.

The transfer entropy at time $i$ and with memory $d$ is

$$T_{X \to Y} = I(X_{i-d},\dots,X_{i-1} ; Y_i | Y_{i-d},\dots,Y_{i-1}).$$

where one does not include the present symbol $X_i$ or the past symbols $X^{i-d-1},Y^{i-d-1}$ before time $i-d$.

Transfer entropy usually assumes stationarity, i.e., $T_{X \to Y}$ does not depend on the time $i$.
