= Causal research =

Causal research, is the investigation of (research into) cause-relationships. To determine causality, variation in the variable presumed to influence the difference in another variable(s) must be detected, and then the variations from the other variable(s) must be calculated (s). Other confounding influences must be controlled for so they don't distort the results, either by holding them constant in the experimental creation of evidence. This type of research is very complex and the researcher can never be completely certain that there are no other factors influencing the causal relationship, especially when dealing with people's attitudes and motivations. There are often much deeper psychological considerations that even the respondent may not be aware of.

There are two research methods for exploring the cause-and-effect relationship between variables:

1. Experimentation (e.g., in a laboratory), and
2. Statistical research.

== Experimentation ==
Experiments are typically conducted in laboratories where many or all aspects of the experiment can be tightly controlled to avoid spurious results due to factors other than the hypothesized causative factor(s). Many studies in physics, for example, use this approach. Alternatively, field experiments can be performed, as with medical studies in which subjects may have a great many attributes that cannot be controlled for but in which at least the key hypothesized causative variables can be varied and some of the extraneous attributes can at least be measured. Field experiments also are sometimes used in economics, such as when two different groups of welfare recipients are given two alternative sets of incentives or opportunities to earn income and the resulting effect on their labor supply is investigated.

== Statistical research ==
In areas such as economics, most empirical research is done on pre-existing data, often collected on a regular basis by a government. Multiple regression is a group of related statistical techniques that control for (attempt to avoid spurious influence from) various causative influences other than the ones being studied. If the data show sufficient variation in the hypothesized explanatory variable of interest, its effect if any upon the potentially influenced variable can be measured.

== See also ==
- Causal analysis
- Causal inference
- Causal model
- Causal reasoning
