= Criticisms of anti-scientific viewpoints =

Criticisms of anti-scientific viewpoints are many and varied.

Most seem to focus on the confusion of conceptual metaphors arising in the process of learning science and negotiating acceptance of scientific truth in the larger culture. In Western education, for instance, students are encouraged to make systematic neutrally-based thinking central, as not taking sides in regard to cultural / ethical / religious traditions and conflicts between them. A common result is that other viewpoints tend to be ranked in comparison to the sciences, particularly the most experimentally-based sciences such as physics or chemistry: they are taken to be the model of neutral systematic reasoning. Mathematics and physics thus tend to be valued more highly as sources of insights into reality, than, say, music or religion. But many societies see those as sources of truth too, and have been skeptical of claims based on mathematics or the sciences — particularly since this mode of thought has been understood to be characteristic of the West and therefore to have something in common with such things as imperialism and colonialism. What is necessarily in common is rarely specified.

Recent philosophic manifestos by literary deconstructionists, radical feminists, and opponents of science generally (e.g., religious, cultural, political, etc.), have concentrated on what is claimed to be an unhealthy link between science and the humanities. The majority of these writers using the term scientism use it in a pejorative fashion, stressing the alleged unhealthy linkages or a claimed suppression by 'science' of other viewpoints. These writers typically view science as little more than a socially constructed ideology, neither having nor deserving any privileged position in comparison to others. In this view, scientists "bully" non-scientists with "oppressive" words such as logic, experiment, objectivity, etc.

Many people (and certainly many scientists) believe this type of criticism to be little more than an essentially anti-scientific 'science envy', having little to do with science itself and much more to do with cultural fears, political difficulties, and unfortunate social histories. Philosopher Susan Haack writes:

One manifestation of science-envy is the mathematical (or logical) pseudo-rigor with which much recent philosophical writing is afflicted. This, to speak bluntly, is a kind of affected obscurity. Not that recourse to the languages of mathematics or logic never helps to make a philosophical argument or thesis clearer; of course, it does. But it can also stand in the way of real clarity by disguising failure to think deeply or critically enough about the concepts being manipulated with [an] impressive logical sophistication. And it has come to be, too often, what Charles Sykes calls "Profspeak" -- using unnecessary symbols to convey a false impression of depth and rigor. Science-envy is manifested also by those who -- hoping to enhance their prestige by close association with the sciences -- contort themselves in attempts to show that this or that philosophical problem can be quickly settled by some scientific result, or to displace philosophical problems in favor of scientific ones. The result is at best a covert change of subject, at worst a self-undermining absurdity. No scientific investigation can tell us whether science is epistemologically special, and if so, how, or whether a theory's yielding true predictions is an indication of its truth, and if so, why, and so on; yet, unless these were not only legitimate questions, but legitimate questions with less-than-skeptical answers, it is incomprehensible how one could be justified, as the most ambitious style of scientism proposes, in doing science instead of philosophy.

== See also ==
- Antiscience
- Panglossianism
- Philosophy of science
- Scientific method
