= Exploratory research =

Type of research process

Exploratory research is "the preliminary research to clarify the exact nature of the problem to be solved." It is used to ensure additional research is taken into consideration during an experiment as well as determining research priorities, collecting data and honing in on certain subjects which may be difficult to take note of without exploratory research. It can include techniques, such as:

- secondary research - such as reviewing available literature and/or data
- informal qualitative approaches, such as discussions with consumers, employees, management or competitors
- formal qualitative research through in-depth interviews, focus groups, projective methods, case studies or pilot studies

According to Stebbins (2001) "Social Science exploration is a broad-ranging, purposive, systematic prearranged undertaking designed to maximize the discovery of generalizations leading to description and understanding". His influential book argues that exploratory research should not use confirmatory mechanisms like hypotheses. It should be qualitative and rely on inductive research methods like grounded theory introduced by Glaser and Strauss Qualitative exploratory research which use inductive approach do not use priori theorizing or build on previous research. Casula, Rangarajan and Shields (2020) argue that exploratory research should not be limited to inductive approaches. They propose the working hypothesis is a useful framework for deductive exploratory research that should be part of the social scientist's tool bag.

Exploratory research can gain insight and information for a study without restrictions of scientific rigger. An outside audience will be used for this research; researchers use this as an opportunity to learn which methods are most productive. It also clarifies research team's objectives throughout the duration of a project.

Regardless of what field research needs to be done in, exploratory research can be used in a multitude of fields. However, as a result of this it is important to acknowledge how the different fields will impact any research that will be conducted. Comparing and contrasting different techniques, such as secondary research, discussions, or qualitative research through focus groups, surveys or case studies will be useful to observe. Within exploratory research, the Internet allows for research methods that are more interactive in nature. For example:

- RSS feeds efficiently supply researchers with up-to-date information
- services such as Google Alerts may send major search-engine search results by email to researchers
- services such as Google Trends track comprehensive search results over lengthy periods of time
- researchers may set up websites to attract worldwide feedback on any subject

When research aims to gain familiarity with a phenomenon or to acquire new insight into it in order to formulate a more precise problem or to develop a hypothesis, exploratory studies (also known as formulative research) come in handy. If the theory happens to be too general or too specific, a hypothesis cannot be formulated. Therefore, a need for an exploratory research may be realized and instituted to gain experience that may help in formulating a relevant hypothesis for more definite investigation.

The results of exploratory research are not usually useful for decision-making by themselves, but they can provide significant insight into a given situation. Although the results of qualitative research can give some indication as to the "why", "how" and "when" something occurs, they cannot reveal "how often" or "how many".

Exploratory research is not typically generalizable to the population at large.

Social exploratory research "seeks to find out how people get along in the setting under question, what meanings they give to their actions, and what issues concern them. The goal is to learn 'what is going on here?' and to investigate social phenomena without explicit expectations." This methodology is also at times referred to as a grounded theory approach to qualitative research or interpretive research, and is an attempt to unearth a theory from the data itself rather than from a predisposed hypothesis.

Earl Babbie identifies three purposes of social-science research: exploratory, descriptive and explanatory.

- Exploratory research takes place when problems are in a preliminary stage. Exploratory research is used when the topic or issue is new and when data is difficult to collect. Exploratory research is flexible and can address research questions of all types (what, why, how). Exploratory research is often used to generate formal hypotheses. Shields and Tajalli link exploratory research with the conceptual framework working hypothesis. Skeptics, however, have questioned the usefulness and necessity of exploratory research in situations where prior analysis could be conducted instead.

== Applied research ==
Applied research in administration is often exploratory because there is need for flexibility in approaching the problem. In addition there are often data limitations and a need to make a decision within a short time period. Qualitative research methods such as case study or field research are often used in exploratory research.

There are three types of objectives in a marketing research project:

- Exploratory research or formulative research
- Descriptive research
- Causal research (also referred to as explanatory research)

Exploratory research or formulative research: The objective of exploratory research is to gather preliminary information that will help define problems and suggest hypotheses.

Descriptive research: The objective of descriptive research is to describe the characteristics of various aspects, such as the market potential for a product or the demographics and attitudes of consumers who buy the product.

Causal research: The objective of causal research is to test hypotheses about cause-and-effect relationships. If the objective is to determine which variable might be causing a certain behavior, i.e. whether there is a cause and effect relationship between variables, causal research must be undertaken. In order to determine causality, it is important to hold the variable that is assumed to cause the change in the other variable(s) constant and then measure the changes in the other variable(s). This type of research is very complex and the researcher can never be completely certain that there are not other factors influencing the causal relationship, especially when dealing with people's attitudes and motivations. There are often much deeper psychological considerations, that even the respondent may not be aware of this is not true.

There are two research methods for exploring the cause and effect relationship between variables:

1. Experimentation, and
2. Simulation

== Bibliography ==
- Russell K. Schutt, Investigating the Social World, 5th ed, Pine Forge Press.
- Robert A. Stebbins, Exploratory Research in the Social Sciences. Thousand Oaks, CA: Sage, 2001.
- Exploratory Research: 3 Reasons to Conduct More of It. (2019, September 16). Retrieved from https://www.gutcheckit.com/blog/3-reasons-conduct-exploratory-research/
- Zahl, H. A., & Reilley, E. M. (1958). Exploratory Research. American Institute of Physics, 11(8). doi:10.1063/1.3062684
- Gellar, L., Druker, S., Osganian, S. K., Gapinski, M. A., LaPelle, N., & Pbert, L. (2012). Exploratory Research to Design a School Nurse-Delivered Intervention to Treat Adolescent Overweight and Obesity. Journal of Nutrition Education and Behavior, 44(1), 46–54. doi: https://doi.org/10.1016/j.jneb.2011.02.00
- Casula, M., Rangarajan, N. & Shields, P. The potential of working hypotheses for deductive exploratory research. Qual Quant (2020). https://doi.org/10.1007/s11135-020-01072-9 Open access!
