= Secondary research =

Summary of research

Secondary research involves the summary, collation and/or synthesis of existing research. Secondary research is contrasted with primary research in that primary research involves the generation of data, whereas secondary research uses primary research sources as a source of data for analysis. A notable marker of primary research is the inclusion of a "methods" section, where the authors describe how the data was generated.

Common examples of secondary research include textbooks, encyclopedias, news articles, review articles, and meta analyses.

When conducting secondary research, authors may draw data from published academic papers, government documents, statistical databases, and historical records.

== Fields ==
The term is widely used in fields such as history, legal research, market research, and Wikipedia editing. The principal methodology in health secondary research is the systematic review, commonly using meta-analytic statistical techniques. Other methods of synthesis, like realist reviews and meta-narrative reviews, have been developed in the 21st century.

Secondary market research includes the reuse by a second party of any data collected from a first party such as telephone interviews or surveys. Secondary market research can be broken up into two categories: information from internal sources such as an agency or company, and information from external sources held outside an organization or agency. Secondary market research uses information from the past, reuses data already collected, and is more economical.

== Primary research vs secondary research ==
Primary research is research that is collected firsthand and is original to the person using it. When conducting primary research, the goal is to answer questions that have not been answered in the published literature. Additionally, the research has to be verified by others to help eliminate one's own biases. Primary research can be a survey, observation, or an interview. This type of research tends to be more time consuming and can be costly. If possible, secondary research should be done before primary research.

Secondary research is based on already published data and information gathered from other conducted studies. It is a common practice by researchers to conduct secondary research before primary research in order to determine what information is not already available. Secondary research is an easy place to start when starting a new research project. Secondary research can vary in credibility depending on where the data is coming from and who is sharing research.
