= Hypothesis =

Proposed explanation for an observation, phenomenon, or scientific problem

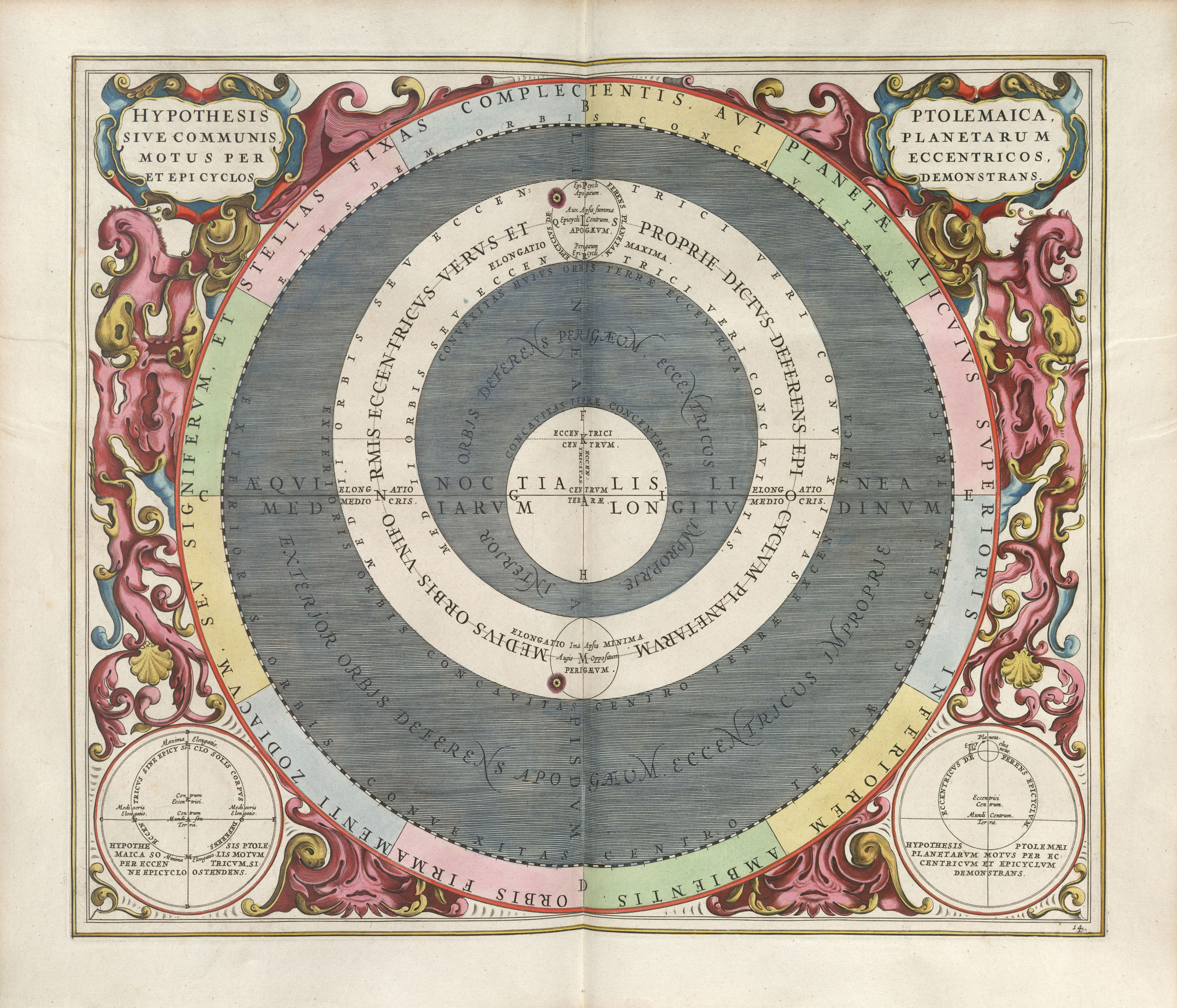
The hypothesis of Andreas Cellarius, showing the planetary motions in eccentric and epicyclical orbits

A hypothesis (pl.: hypotheses) is a proposed explanation for a phenomenon. A scientific hypothesis must be based on observations and make a testable and reproducible prediction about reality, in a process beginning with an educated guess. If a hypothesis is repeatedly independently demonstrated by experiment to be true, it becomes a scientific theory. In colloquial usage, the words hypothesis and theory are often used interchangeably, but this is incorrect in the context of science.

A working hypothesis is a provisionally-accepted hypothesis used for the purpose of pursuing further progress in research. Working hypotheses are frequently discarded, and often proposed with knowledge (and warning) that they are incomplete and thus false, with the intent of moving research in at least somewhat the right direction, especially when scientists are stuck on an issue and brainstorming ideas.

In formal logic, a hypothesis is the antecedent in a proposition. For example, in the proposition "If P, then Q", statement P denotes the hypothesis (or antecedent) of the consequent Q. Hypothesis P is the assumption in a (possibly counterfactual) "what if" question. The adjective "hypothetical" (having the nature of a hypothesis or being assumed to exist as an immediate consequence of a hypothesis), can refer to any of the above meanings of the term "hypothesis".

== Uses ==
In its ancient usage, hypothesis referred to a summary of the plot of a classical drama. The English word hypothesis comes from the ancient Greek word ὑπόθεσις (hypothesis), whose literal or etymological sense is "putting or placing under" and hence in extended use has many other meanings including "supposition".

In Plato's Meno (86e–87b), Socrates dissects virtue with a method which he says is used by mathematicians, that of "investigating from a hypothesis". In this sense, 'hypothesis' refers to a clever idea or a short cut, or a convenient mathematical approach that simplifies cumbersome calculations. Cardinal Robert Bellarmine gave a famous example of this usage in the warning issued to Galileo in the early 17th century: that he must not treat the motion of the Earth as a reality, but merely as a hypothesis.

In common usage in the 21st century, a hypothesis refers to a provisional idea whose merit requires evaluation. For proper evaluation, the framer of a hypothesis needs to define specifics in operational terms. A hypothesis requires more work by the researcher in order to either confirm or disprove it. In due course, a confirmed hypothesis may become part of a theory or occasionally may grow to become a theory itself. Normally, scientific hypotheses have the form of a mathematical model. Sometimes, but not always, one can also formulate them as existential statements, stating that some particular instance of the phenomenon under examination has some characteristic and causal explanations, which have the general form of universal statements, stating that every instance of the phenomenon has a particular characteristic.

In entrepreneurial setting, a hypothesis is used to formulate provisional ideas about the attributes of products or business models. The formulated hypothesis is then evaluated, where the hypothesis is proven to be either "true" or "false" through a verifiability- or falsifiability-oriented experiment.

Any useful hypothesis will enable predictions by reasoning (including deductive reasoning). It might predict the outcome of an experiment in a laboratory setting or the observation of a phenomenon in nature. The prediction may also invoke statistics and only talk about probabilities. Karl Popper, following others, has argued that a hypothesis must be falsifiable, and that one cannot regard a proposition or theory as scientific if it does not admit the possibility of being shown to be false. Other philosophers of science have rejected the criterion of falsifiability or supplemented it with other criteria, such as verifiability (e.g., verificationism) or coherence (e.g., confirmation holism). The scientific method involves experimentation to test the ability of some hypothesis to adequately answer the question under investigation. In contrast, unfettered observation is not as likely to raise unexplained issues or open questions in science, as would the formulation of a crucial experiment to test the hypothesis. A thought experiment might also be used to test the hypothesis.

In framing a hypothesis, the investigator must not currently know the outcome of a test or that it remains reasonably under continuing investigation. Only in such cases does the experiment, test or study potentially increase the probability of showing the truth of a hypothesis. If the researcher already knows the outcome, it counts as a "consequence" — and the researcher should have already considered this while formulating the hypothesis. If one cannot assess the predictions by observation or by experience, the hypothesis needs to be tested by others providing observations. For example, a new technology or theory might make the necessary experiments feasible.

== Scientific hypothesis ==
A trial solution to a problem is commonly referred to as a hypothesis—or, often, as an "educated guess"—because it provides a suggested outcome based on the evidence. However, some scientists reject the term "educated guess" as incorrect. Experimenters may test and reject several hypotheses before solving the problem.

According to Schick and Vaughn, researchers weighing up alternative hypotheses may take into consideration:

- Testability (compare falsifiability as discussed above)
- Parsimony (as in the application of "Occam's razor", discouraging the postulation of excessive numbers of entities)
- Scope – the apparent applicability of the hypothesis to multiple known phenomena
- Fruitfulness – the prospect that the hypothesis may explain further phenomena in the future
- Conservatism – the degree of "fit" with existing recognized knowledge-systems.

== Working hypothesis ==
A working hypothesis is a hypothesis that is provisionally accepted as a basis for further research in the hope that a tenable theory will be produced, even if the hypothesis ultimately fails. Like all hypotheses, a working hypothesis is constructed as a statement of expectations, which can be linked to the exploratory research purpose in empirical investigation. Working hypotheses are often used as a conceptual framework in qualitative research.

The provisional nature of working hypotheses makes them useful as an organizing device in applied research. Here they act like a useful guide to address problems that are still in a formative phase.

In recent years, philosophers of science have tried to integrate the various approaches to evaluating hypotheses, and the scientific method in general, to form a more complete system that integrates the individual concerns of each approach. Notably, Imre Lakatos and Paul Feyerabend, Karl Popper's colleague and student, respectively, have produced novel attempts at such a synthesis.

== Hypotheses, concepts and measurement ==
Concepts in Hempel's deductive-nomological model play a key role in the development and testing of hypotheses. Most formal hypotheses connect concepts by specifying the expected relationships between propositions. When a set of hypotheses are grouped together, they become a type of conceptual framework. When a conceptual framework is complex and incorporates causality or explanation, it is generally referred to as a theory. According to noted philosopher of science Carl Gustav Hempel,

An adequate empirical interpretation turns a theoretical system into a testable theory: The hypothesis whose constituent terms have been interpreted become capable of test by reference to observable phenomena. Frequently the interpreted hypothesis will be derivative hypotheses of the theory; but their confirmation or disconfirmation by empirical data will then immediately strengthen or weaken also the primitive hypotheses from which they were derived.

Hempel provides a useful metaphor that describes the relationship between a conceptual framework and the framework as it is observed and perhaps tested (interpreted framework). "The whole system floats, as it were, above the plane of observation and is anchored to it by rules of interpretation. These might be viewed as strings which are not part of the network but link certain points of the latter with specific places in the plane of observation. By virtue of those interpretative connections, the network can function as a scientific theory." Hypotheses with concepts anchored in the plane of observation are ready to be tested. In "actual scientific practice the process of framing a theoretical structure and of interpreting it are not always sharply separated, since the intended interpretation usually guides the construction of the theoretician". It is, however, "possible and indeed desirable, for the purposes of logical clarification, to separate the two steps conceptually".

=== Statistical hypothesis testing ===
When a possible correlation or similar relation between phenomena is investigated, such as whether a proposed remedy is effective in treating a disease, the hypothesis that a relation exists cannot be examined the same way one might examine a proposed new law of nature. In such an investigation, if the tested remedy shows no effect in a few cases, these do not necessarily falsify the hypothesis. Instead, statistical tests are used to determine how likely it is that the overall effect would be observed if the hypothesized relation does not exist. If that likelihood is sufficiently small (e.g., less than 1%), the existence of a relation may be assumed. Otherwise, any observed effect may be due to pure chance.

In statistical hypothesis testing, two hypotheses are compared. These are called the null hypothesis and the alternative hypothesis. The null hypothesis is the hypothesis that states that there is no relation between the phenomena whose relation is under investigation, or at least not of the form given by the alternative hypothesis. The alternative hypothesis, as the name suggests, is the alternative to the null hypothesis: it states that there is some kind of relation. The alternative hypothesis may take several forms, depending on the nature of the hypothesized relation; in particular, it can be two-sided (for example: there is some effect, in a yet unknown direction) or one-sided (the direction of the hypothesized relation, positive or negative, is fixed in advance).

Conventional significance levels for testing hypotheses (acceptable probabilities of wrongly rejecting a true null hypothesis) are .10, .05, and .01. The significance level for deciding whether the null hypothesis is rejected and the alternative hypothesis is accepted must be determined in advance, before the observations are collected or inspected. If these criteria are determined later, when the data to be tested are already known, the test is invalid.

The above procedure is actually dependent on the number of the participants (units or sample size) that are included in the study. For instance, to avoid having the sample size be too small to reject a null hypothesis, it is recommended that one specify a sufficient sample size from the beginning. It is advisable to define a small, medium and large effect size for each of a number of important statistical tests which are used to test the hypotheses.

== Honours ==
Mount Hypothesis in Antarctica is named in appreciation of the role of hypotheses in scientific research.

== List ==
Several hypotheses have been put forth, in different subject areas:

- Astronomical hypotheses
- Authorship debates
- Biological hypotheses
- Documentary hypothesis
- Hypothetical documents
- Hypothetical impact events
- Hypothetical laws
- Linguistic theories and hypotheses
- Meteorological hypotheses
- Hypothetical objects
- Origin hypotheses of ethnic groups
- Hypothetical processes
- Hypothetical spacecraft
- Statistical hypothesis testing
- Hypothetical technology

== See also ==
- Axiom
- Bold hypothesis
- Case study
- Conjecture
- Explanandum and explanans
- Hypothesis theory – a research area in cognitive psychology
- Hypothetical question
- Logical positivism
- Operationalization
- Philosophiae Naturalis Principia Mathematica – for Newton's position on hypotheses
- Reductionism
- Research design
- Sociology of scientific knowledge
- Theorem#Hypothesis
- Thesis statement

== Bibliography ==
- Popper, Karl R. (1959), "The Logic of Scientific Discovery", Physics Today, 12 (11): 53, Bibcode:1959PhT....12k..53P, doi:10.1063/1.3060577 1934, 1959.
