= Gender pay gap =

Average difference in remuneration amounts between men and women

Gender wage gap in the OECD

The gender pay gap or gender wage gap is the average difference between the remuneration for men and women who are employed. In most countries, women are paid less than men for the same work.

- non-adjusted pay gap is the average difference in yearly earnings between male and female workers
- adjusted pay gap is the difference between how much men and women make for the same work, and it takes into account differences in hours worked, occupations chosen, education attained, and job experience.

The global unadjusted gender pay gap is 68.5%. Recently, the pay gap has decreased most rapidly in Global South developing countries. In the European Union, there has been little change in the gender pay gap in the 21st century. In 2024 in the United States, according to Pew Research, women earned 85% as much as men, slightly up from 81% in 2003. Developed Asian economies have also entered a stage of relative stability, yet income disparities remain relatively larger compared with those in Western economies.

The adjusted gender pay gap is much smaller. This means that while women earn less over all, it is primarily due to differences between the jobs and working hours of men and women, rather than differences in pay for the same work. If occupational sorting is an outcome of gender discrimination, this would make it a bad control, making it impossible to draw valid conclusions about the role of gender discrimination on earnings. Although rewarding greater ability and productivity with increased responsibilities and compensation is generally regarded as a reasonable principle, evaluations of equality should also consider gender differences in career opportunities and trajectories. More comprehensive models are needed to assess equality fairly without bias or overcorrection.

Causes for gender pay gaps include having children and parental leave, gender discrimination, and gender norms. In the EU around two-thirds of the gender overall earnings gap is associated with lower women's working hours (gender hours gap) and lower women's employment rate (gender employment gap). The gender pay gap can be a problem from a public policy perspective in developing countries because it reduces economic output and means that women are more likely to be dependent upon welfare payments, especially in old age.

== Historical perspective ==
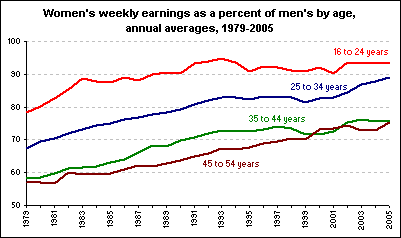
Women's weekly earnings as a percentage of men's in the U.S. by age, 1979–2005

In the United States, women's pay has increased relative to men's since the 1960s. According to US census data, women's median earnings in 1963 were 56% of men's. In 2016, women's median earnings had increased to 79% of men's. Analysis from the Institute for Women's Policy Research published in 2017 predicted that average pay would reach parity in 2059.

According to a 2021 study on historical gender wage ratios, women in Southern Europe earned approximately half as much as unskilled men between 1300 and 1800. In Northern and Western Europe, the ratio was far higher but it declined over the period 1500–1800.

A 2005 meta-analysis by Doris Weichselbaumer and Rudolf Winter-Ebmer of more than 260 published pay gap studies across over 60 countries found that, from the 1960s to the 1990s, raw (unadjusted) wage differentials worldwide fell substantially from around 65% to 30%. The bulk of this decline was due to better labor market endowments of women (i.e., better education, training, and work attachment).

Another meta-analysis of 41 empirical studies on the wage gap, conducted in 1998, found a similar time trend in estimated pay gaps: a decrease of roughly 1% per year.

A 2011 study by the British CMI concluded that if pay growth for female executives continues at current rates, the earnings gap between female and male executives would not be closed until 2109.

By 2022, cross-country comparisons show wide variation in the gender earnings gap, even after controlling for factors such as age, education, and part-time employment. The gap was lowest in Hungary at 9.9% and highest in South Korea at 40.6%. Analyses limited to wage differences within the same job category reveal a different distribution across countries. In Israel, gender was estimated to account for about 35% of the pay difference observed in identical roles. By contrast, in Hungary, nearly the entire within-job gap (96%) was attributed to gender. Spain recorded a relatively high share at 77%, while Germany (54%) and the United States (48%) were closer to mid-range levels.

== Calculation ==
The non-adjusted gender pay gap or gender wage gap is typically the median or mean average difference between the remuneration for all working men and women in the sample chosen. It is usually represented as either a percentage or a ratio of the "difference between average gross hourly [or annual] earnings of male and female employees as % of male gross earnings".

The pay gap may be measured using different metrics: some studies compare the hourly wages of all workers, while others restrict the analysis to full-time, year-round workers. A 2025 analysis by the Pew Research Center found that in the United States, women earned about 85% of what men earned across hourly earnings (full- and part-time included).

Some countries use only the full-time working population to calculate national gender gaps. Others are based on a sample from the entire working population of a country (including part-time workers), in which case the full-time equivalent (FTE) is used to obtain the remuneration for an equal amount of paid hours worked.

Non-governmental organizations apply the calculation to various samples. Some share how the calculation was performed and on which data set. The gender pay gap can, for example, be measured by ethnicity, by city, by job, or within a single organization.

== Causes ==
Decomposition of the gender wage gap (2010)

Some variables that help explain the non-adjusted gender pay gap include economic activity, working time, and job tenure. Gender-specific factors, including gender differences in qualifications and discrimination, overall wage structure, and the differences in remuneration across industry sectors all influence the gender pay gap.

=== Industry sector ===
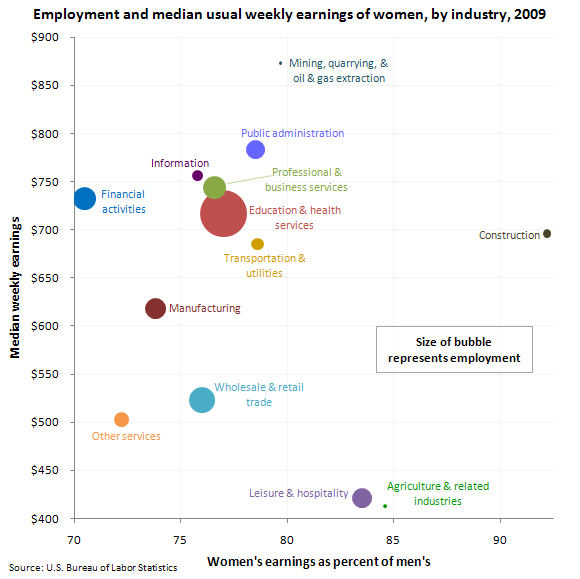
U.S. women's weekly earnings, employment, and percentage of men's earnings, by industry, 2009

Occupational segregation or horizontal segregation refers to disparity in pay associated with occupational earnings.

A 2022 study by Folbre et al. illustrates how the concentration of women in care occupations contributes significantly to the gender pay gap. Their findings show that, while both women and men are affected by the care services wage penalties, women in these occupations face greater tribulations considering they are more likely to be employed in care services. In Jacobs (1995), Boyd et al. refer to the horizontal division of labor as "high-tech" (predominantly men) versus "high-touch" (predominantly women) with high tech being more financially rewarding. Men are more likely to be in relatively high-paying, dangerous industries such as mining, construction, or manufacturing and to be represented by a union. Women, in contrast, are more likely to be in clerical jobs and to work in the service industry.

A study of the US labor force in the 1990s suggested that gender differences in occupation, industry and union status explain an estimated 53% of the wage gap. A 2017 study in the American Economic Journal: Macroeconomics found that the growing importance of the services sector has played a role in reducing the gender gap in pay and hours. In 1998, adjusting for both differences in human capital and in industry, occupation, and unionism increases the size of American women's average earnings from 80% of American men's to 91%.

A 2017 study by the US National Science Foundation's annual census revealed pay gaps in different areas of science. There is a much larger proportion of men in higher-paying fields such as mathematics and computer science, the two highest-paying scientific fields. Men accounted for about 75% of doctoral degrees in those fields (a proportion that has barely changed since 2007), and were expected to earn $113,000 compared with $99,000 for women. In the social sciences, the difference between men and women with PhD's was significantly smaller, with men earning ~$66,000 and women ~$62,000. However, in some fields, women earn more: women in chemistry earn ~$85,000, about $5,000 more than their male colleagues.

A Morningstar analysis of senior executive pay data revealed that senior executive women earned 84.6 cents for every dollar earned by male executives in 2019. Women also remained outnumbered in the C-Suite 7 to 1.

A 2020 analysis by the Institute for Women’s Policy Research found that gender wage disparities are present across most major occupational groups in the United States. The report noted that women working full-time in similar occupations still earned less than men, indicating that occupational wage gaps cannot be fully explained by differences in hours worked, part-time status, or employment type. Wage penalties were documented in a variety of professional and service sectors, suggesting that industry-level pay disparities persist even among full-time workers with comparable roles.

=== Sexual harassment ===
Sexual Harassment in the workplace rooted in gender imbalance can cause women choosing a field or sector with more female colleagues, which increases the separation of men and women in a field. This separation is a factor in wage disparity, as positions usually held by men are paid higher than the positions usually held by women. Harassment against women in male-dominated fields occurs at higher rates than harassment against women in mixed-gender fields and it creates a barrier preventing women from advancing in a male-dominated field, causing them to seek lower wage jobs or restart their career which prevents them from bridging the pay gap. Sexual harassment creates costs to the victim and to the company as economic models show that harassment lowers wages, creates losses due to turnovers and legal costs, and shapes the labor market as a whole by segregating which gender can work in a specific sector.

Industries that have seen large gender disparities with higher male dominance include engineering, motor vehicles and transportation, energy and water control, and manufacturing. Industries with a higher female domination include nursing, sales, and social work. Industries with either type of gender domination have reported cases of sexual harassment, and this has an impact on the sector, with lost work costing $125,000 to $1,300,000 annually.

Sexual harassment can also occur in a power imbalance, such as a low-wage job in which one depends on a customer for tips, and in cases of isolation, such as a domestic care worker alone with a patient or client at a residence. This creates variability of risk, which pushes victims to choose one career over another to avoid risk, and it creates a further pay gap by separating labor and risk by gender. The company can accommodate risk through payouts; however, men are paid more for the risk they face than women who face the same or higher risk. Lack of pay, increased risk, and harassment rates cause women to move to lower-paying jobs across the labor market.

Policies against sexual harassment in the workplace do not have international standards; the definition and classification of sexual harassment are unable to encompass all cases or cultures, and methods of circumventing legal policies to condemn harassment cause women to avoid higher-paying jobs due to poor legal protections. At the national level, laws prohibiting sexual harassment in the workplace improve women's economic outcomes and increase productivity for companies, creating a favorable labor market.

=== Discrimination ===
A 2015 meta-analysis of studies of experimental simulations of employment found that "men were preferred for male-dominated jobs (i.e., gender-role congruity bias), whereas no strong preference for either gender was found for female-dominated or integrated jobs". However, a meta-analysis of real-life correspondence experiments found that "men applying for strongly female-stereotyped jobs need to make between twice to three times as many applications as do women to receive a positive response for these jobs" and "women applying to male-dominated jobs face lower levels of discrimination in comparison to men applying to female-dominated jobs." A 2018 systematic review of almost all correspondence experiments since 2005 found that most studies found that the evidence for gender discrimination "is very mixed", and that the amount of gender discrimination varies by occupation, though two studies found "a significant penalty for being pregnant or being a mother". A 2018 audit study found that high-achieving men are called back more frequently by employers than equally high-achieving women (at a rate of nearly 2-to-1).

In a 2016 interview, Harvard Economist Claudia Goldin argued that overt discrimination by employers was no longer a significant cause of the gender pay gap, and that the cause is instead more subtle cultural expectations, which are a legacy of historical discrimination. According to Goldin, these expectations cause women, on average, to prioritize temporal flexibility, take different risks, and avoid situations where discrimination is expected. She advocated educational reforms to address the remaining gender pay gap rather than mandates on business, arguing that the latter is too difficult to implement given the demands of the current business environment.

A series of four studies from 2019 found that "even if these careers do not pay less, people assume that men will be less interested in any career that is majority female" and that this has "the potential to create a self-fulfilling prophecy in that people are also less interested in promoting pay raises in female-dominated caregiving careers ... yet if more men were to enter these occupations, the salaries in these fields might also rise".

Some critics of the notion that discrimination causes the gender wage gap argue that the gap disappears once analysts control for job characteristics (e.g., location, tenure, job role, level, performance). However, this is considered a textbook error in econometrics because occupational sorting may itself be an outcome of gender discrimination, making it a bad control. By controlling for job characteristics, the analyst introduces collider bias into the analysis, making it impossible to draw valid conclusions about the role of gender discrimination on earnings.

=== Parenthood and motherhood penalty ===
Studies have shown that an increasing share of the gender pay gap over time is due to children. The phenomenon of lower wages due to childbearing has been termed the motherhood penalty. In short, the motherhood penalty depicts the greater disadvantage mothers face in terms of earning less wages than a childless woman. According to a study conducted by the Joint Economic Committee, in 2014, mothers were shown to earn 3% less than childless women and 15% less than childless men. Although the gender pay gap has indeed narrowed, this phenomenon is essentially only significant for childless men and women. Further, studies have shown that the motherhood penalty has been unwavering, rather than declining like the gender pay gap.

The contribution of the motherhood penalty to the disparity in earnings between genders differs between countries; in Southern Europe, mothers earn more than childless women, in Nordic countries, mothers earn slightly less, in Continental Europe and Anglo-Saxon European countries, the difference is larger, and in Eastern Europe, a large part of the pay gap is due to motherhood.

Traditionally, mothers leave the workforce temporarily to take care of their children. The length of parental leave for mothers affects gender pay: shorter parental leave may lead women to leave the workforce, longer parental leave can result in reduced wages for mothers, and moderate leave allows mothers to balance career and motherhood. The availability of childcare can reduce the motherhood penalty as well as increase workplace participation by mothers.

Women tend to take lower-paying jobs because they are more likely to have more flexible schedules than in higher-paying jobs. Since women are more likely to work fewer hours than men, they have less experience, which will cause women to be behind in the workforce. Mothers are more likely to work part-time.

A 2019 study conducted in Germany found that women with children are discriminated against in the job market, whereas men with children are not. In contrast, a 2020 study in the Netherlands found little evidence for discrimination against women in hiring based on their parental status.

Studies also show that this discrimination is a result of how employers tend to view mothers and fathers differently after having children. Mothers are viewed as being less committed to their jobs after having children, while fathers are seen as more reliable. The assumptions that mothers are less committed and less reliable persist even when both have experience and qualifications. This significantly impacts their professional careers by delaying women's promotions and other hiring opportunities. Studies also show that mothers tend to receive smaller salary raises and have fewer opportunities to rise in their careers compared to childless women and men.

Another explanation of the gender pay gap is the distribution of housework. Couples who raise a child tend to assign the mother to do the larger share of housework and take on the main responsibility for childcare, and, as a result, women tend to have less time available for wage-earning. This reinforces the pay gap between males and females in the labor market, and now people are trapped in this self-reinforcing cycle.

=== Maternity leave in the United States ===
The United States maternity leave policy provides employees who have worked the required hours with a total of 12 weeks of unpaid leave. However, these benefits are only required of employers with more than 50 employees. Smaller businesses or companies with less than 50 people are not required to provide leave for new mothers. While the 12 weeks are intended to be used after a mother gives birth or newly adopts, the time can also be used up if there are complications with the pregnancy that require them to miss work. The 12-week unpaid policy in the U.S. is being expanded upon in a few states across the country. For example, New Jersey is now offering new mothers and their families the option to enroll in programs that provide compensation while they are away from their jobs.

The National Bureau of Economic Research has found that in Denmark, most of the wage gap gender inequality was because of children. The researchers found that the arrival of children creates a long-run earnings gap of around 20 percent for women, while men remain unaffected. The researchers also found that the amount of child-related gender inequality has increased significantly over time, from approximately 40 percent in 1980 to 80 percent in 2013.

The introduction of a child to some American families results in 43% of new mothers in STEM (Science, Technology, Engineering, and Mathematics) to face major career changes, varying from abandoning the workforce entirely to exchanging their careers in STEM for part-time work, or a career in another field. While this is true for new mothers, some studies show that both new mothers and fathers report being affected by “flexibility stigma” in the workplace. Flexibility stigma can be defined as the consequences imposed on workers for attempting to balance the responsibilities of their careers and families. It has also been found that career-people of the STEM field with young children face more "work-family" conflict, as the demands of the rigorous STEM field and those of their young children overlap.

=== Gender norms ===
Another social factor related to the aforementioned one is the socialization of individuals into adopting specific gender roles. Job choices influenced by socialization are often slotted in to "demand-side" decisions in frameworks of wage discrimination, rather than a result of extant labor market discrimination influencing job choice. Men that are in non-traditional job roles or jobs that are primarily seen as a women-focused jobs, such as nursing, have high enough job satisfaction that motivates the men to continue in these job fields despite criticism they may receive.

According to a 1998 study, in the eyes of some employees, women in middle management are perceived to lack the courage, leadership, and drive that male managers appear to have, despite female middle managers achieving results on par with their male counterparts in terms of successful projects and achieving results for their employing companies. These perceptions, along with the factors previously described in the article, contribute to the difficulty of women to ascend to the executive ranks when compared to men in similar positions.

Societal ideas of gender roles stem somewhat from media influences. Media portrays ideals of gender-specific roles off of which gender stereotypes are built. These stereotypes then translate to what types of work men and women can or should do. In this way, gender plays a mediating role in work discrimination, and women find themselves in positions that do not allow for the same advancements as men.

Some research suggests that women are more likely to volunteer for tasks that are less likely to help them earn promotions, and that they are more likely to be asked to volunteer and to say yes to such requests.

=== Gender socialization and career choice ===
Studies show that the pay gap begins to take shape early in children's lives and does not begin at the workplace. Different socialization influences teach children what jobs are for them and how one is more fitting for one gender over another. Because of this, girls end up pursuing careers that focus on communication and caregiving, while boys pursue careers that focus on STEM and leadership roles. This matters when it comes to the topic of gender pay gap because female-dominated fields pay less on average, and this affects the wage gap.

=== Negotiation expectations and backlash ===
Studies show that women are less likely than men to negotiate competitively. They are less likely to negotiate because of fear of backlash for being assertive. Gender role expectations have a direct link to negotiation behavior. Men are expected to be assertive and competitive, while women are expected to be cooperative. Research suggests that transparency with salary expectations helps women request higher salaries and face less backlash. However, this doesn't completely solve the wage gap problem, as men become more competitive when given salary information.

=== Glass ceilings ===
The Glass Ceiling model is a systemic form of gender discrimination utilized to uphold the gender pay gap by barring women from higher-level and higher-paying roles due to occupational bias and gender-based wages. In different stages of hiring processes, the glass ceiling presents itself through discrimination in favor of gender:

- Given two resumes with identical experiences and qualifications, the resume with a male name is more likely to be selected due to gender stereotypes.
- In interviews, women are asked about family and maternity plans.
- Job offers and promotions are lower for women due to beliefs that women are more family-oriented and will not prioritize the company, nor will they take on higher levels of risk.
- Women in leadership positions are evaluated at a higher degree; while some industries promote women more frequently than men, they are still compensated less.

During a job search, men and women evaluate jobs differently based on pay. Men apply to jobs using "direct and aggressive strategies" of networking and resources. In contrast, women use "passive and indirect methods", which reveals that women evaluate a job based on gendered biases and underestimate their abilities, but men evaluate a job based on pay.

The Glass Ceiling exists on a spectrum that impacts gender with factors of race, physical ability, and social class, which causes discrimination at lower levels of the hiring stage to shape who reaches senior levels at the company. This creates a chain sequence of gender barriers across fields and countries; in a 20-year research period of 86 studies, researchers found that glass ceilings are most notable in higher paying positions but the discrimination occurs at many levels of the company including "individual, social, and cultural structures" This is linked to women having a higher exit rate across levels of a company due to high risk, family commitment, discrimination, and decreased wages, causing male-domination of a field. This male-domination leads to "masculine communications and structures" which women can not integrate with.

=== Technology and automation ===
Automation is expected to affect male and female employment differently, given the overall labor market's strong gendered structure. A 2019 paper by the International Monetary Fund predicted that women are significantly more likely than men to be displaced by automation. The researchers found that female workers performed more routine tasks in their jobs than men did, and that men are more vulnerable to automation. They estimated that "26 million female jobs in 30 countries (28 OECD member countries, Cyprus, and Singapore) are at a high risk of being displaced by technology (i.e., facing higher than 70 percent likelihood of being automated)" over the next two decades.

=== Overwork ===
Claudia Goldin found that the gender pay gap is largely caused by women having children, and that other causes for the pay gap include discrimination and "greedy work". "Greedy work" has been defined as jobs which pay a large premium for overwork (significantly more than 40 hours per week) and round-the-clock availability (e.g. managerial, finance, law, and consulting jobs.). Women who work in those jobs get paid the same as men, though very few women (and fewer mothers) choose overwork jobs, often because it is incompatible with child raising. Goldin's research suggests that the best solution for overwork is that employees need to start demanding more predictability and flexibility, and companies need to realize that more work can be shared and that highly skilled employees are more interchangeable than employers are accustomed to believing.

== Consequences ==
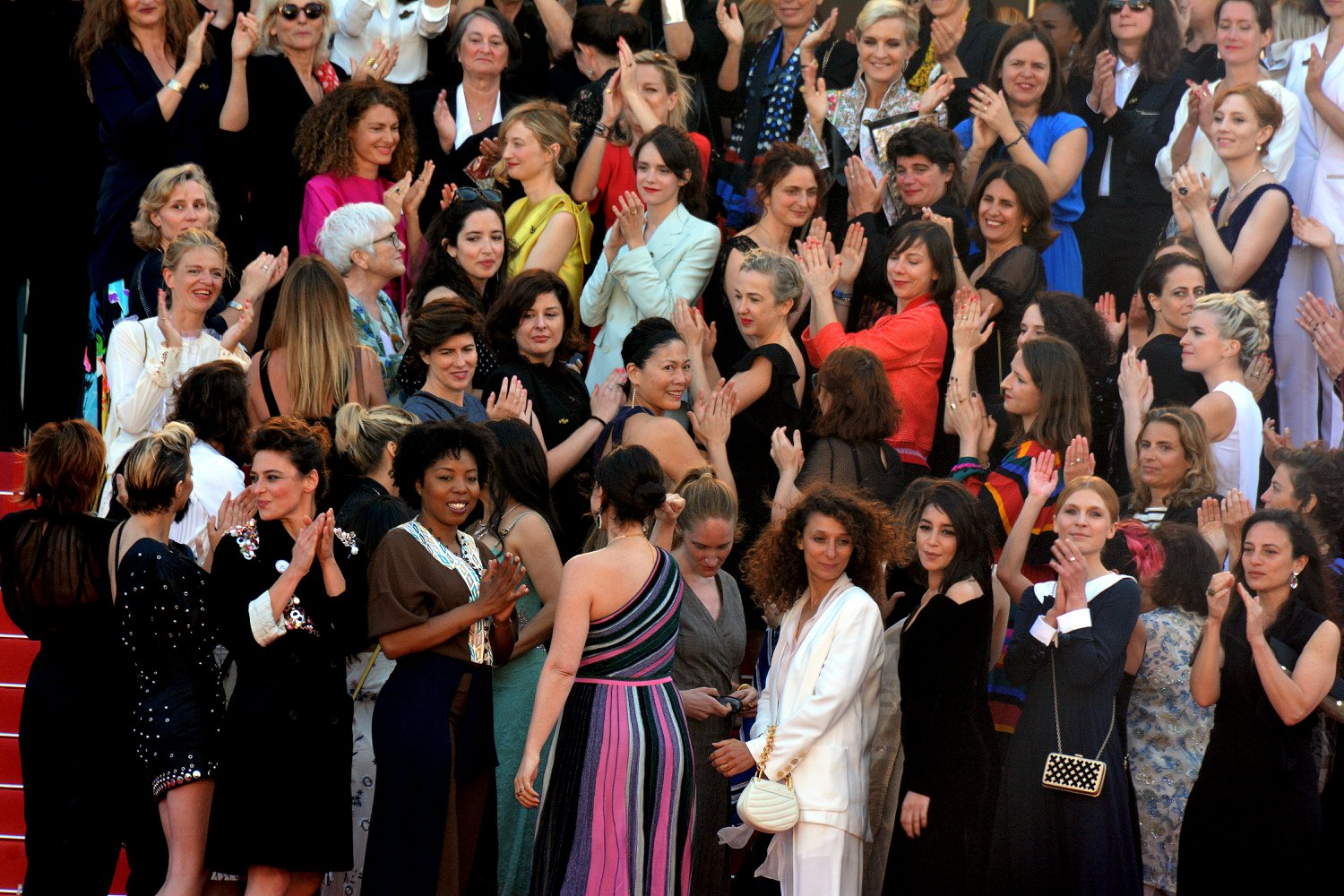
Female filmmakers protesting the gender pay gap and other inequalities in the film industry, during the 2018 Cannes Film Festival

The gender pay gap can be a problem from a public policy perspective because it reduces economic output and means that women are more likely to be dependent upon welfare payments, especially in old age.

=== For economic activity ===
A 2009 report for the Australian Department of Families, Housing, Community Services and Indigenous Affairs argued that, in addition to fairness and equity, there are strong economic imperatives to address the gender wage gap. The researchers estimated that a decrease in the gender wage gap from 17% to 16% would increase GDP per capita by approximately $260, mostly from an increase in the hours females would work. Ignoring opposing factors, as the number of hours females work increases, eliminating the entire gender wage gap from 17% could be worth around $93 billion, or 8.5% of GDP. The researchers estimated the causes of the wage gap as follows, lack of work experience was 7%, lack of formal training was 5%, occupational segregation was 25%, working at smaller firms was 3%, and being female represented the remaining 60%.

An October 2012 study by the American Association of University Women found that over 47 years, an American woman with a college degree will earn about $1.2 million less than a man with the same education. Therefore, closing the pay gap by raising women's wages would have a stimulus effect that would grow the United States economy by at least 3% to 4%.

Using data from 2019, the Institute for Women’s Policy Research reported in May 2021 that if women in the American labor force received pay comparable with their male counterparts, poverty for women in the labor force would be reduced by over 40 percent on average. High poverty rates among working single mothers would fall from 27.7 percent to 16.7 percent. Moreover, they found that equal pay for women in the labor force would increase their annual earnings from $41,402 to $48,326—an increase of $541 billion in overall wage income in the United States economy—equivalent to 2.8 percent of GDP in 2019.

Acting to promote gender equality could add $13 trillion to global GDP by 2030. According to the European Institute for Gender Equality, improving gender equality in the EU might result in a 9.6% rise in EU GDP per capita, or €3.15 trillion, as well as an additional 10.5 million employment by 2050.

The World Economic Forum estimates that closing the gender gap in economic participation and opportunity will take 169 years at current rates of progress.

=== For women's pensions ===
Considering that women earn less than men overall, they are also less likely to be eligible for pension plans. This is because pension plans are generally calculated based on one's salary per year. Further, this would require women to be employed in jobs that offer retirement plans, which they are less likely to be a part of than men. The European Commission argues that the pay gap has significant effects on pensions. Since women's lifetime earnings are, on average, 17.5% lower than men's (as of 2008), they receive lower pensions. As a result, older women are more likely to face poverty: 22% of women aged 65 and over are at risk of poverty compared to 16% of men.

=== For education and debt ===
Analysis conducted by the World Bank and available in the 2019 World Development Report on The Changing Nature of Work connects earnings with skill accumulation, suggesting that women also accumulate less human capital (skills and knowledge) at work and through their careers. The report shows that the payoffs from work experience are lower for women worldwide than for men. For example, in Venezuela, men's wages increase by an average of 2.2 percent for each additional year of work, compared to 1.5 percent for women. In Denmark, by contrast, the payoffs to an additional year of work experience are the same for both men and women, at 5 percent on average. To address these differences, the report argues that governments could seek to remove limitations on the type or nature of work available to women and eliminate rules that limit women's property rights. Parental leave, nursing breaks, and the possibility of flexible or part-time schedules are also identified as potential factors that limit women's learning in the workplace.

=== For domestic violence ===
Economists predict that partners with higher wages have greater bargaining power within their household dynamics. The gender pay gap thus may put women at a disadvantage to their male partners. Moreover, research has found that the fewer resources women have available to them, the less likely they are to leave an abusive relationship. Other economic models have expanded upon this idea, demonstrating that when pursuing divorce is too costly, the threat of domestic violence may act as a potential method to shift bargaining advantages within a household. Researchers have further established an explicit relation between domestic violence and labor market conditions, finding that the decline in the wage gap from 1990 to 2003 explained a nine percent decrease in domestic violence rates. The estimated costs of domestic violence due to medical care and declines in productivity may be as much as $9.3 billion. Women tend to be affected by this more than men, and in addition, exposure to domestic abuse has negative implications not only for adults, but also for children in proximity to the abuse. At least 50 percent of the variability in lifetime earnings can be attributed to early childhood experience, and adults from households with documented abuse and neglect have lower levels of education, as well as economic earnings and assets.

== Economic theories ==
In 2023, economist Claudia Goldin won the Nobel Economics Prize for her work on understanding the gender pay gap. She found that the gender pay gap is largely caused by women having children, and that other causes for the pay gap include discrimination and "greedy work" (jobs which pay a large premium for working significantly more than 40 hours per week and round-the-clock availability.)

=== Neoclassical models ===
In certain neoclassical models, employer discrimination can be inefficient; excluding or limiting the employment of a specific group will raise the wages of groups not facing discrimination. Other firms could then gain a competitive advantage by hiring more workers from the group facing discrimination. As a result, in the long run discrimination would not occur. However, this view depends on strong assumptions about the labor market and the production functions of the firms attempting to discriminate. Firms which discriminate based on real or perceived customer or employee preferences would also not necessarily see discrimination disappear in the long run even under stylized models.

=== Monopsony explanation ===
In monopsony theory, which describes situations with a single buyer (in this case, a "buyer" of labor), wage discrimination can be explained by differences in labor mobility constraints among workers. Ransom and Oaxaca (2005) show that women appear to be less pay-sensitive than men, and therefore employers take advantage of this by discriminating in their pay for women workers.

== Policy measures ==
=== Anti-discrimination legislation ===
According to the 2008 edition of the OECD's Employment Outlook report, almost all OECD countries have enacted laws to combat gender-based discrimination. Examples include the Equal Pay Act of 1963 and Title VII of the Civil Rights Act of 1964. Legal prohibition of discriminatory behavior, however, can only be effective if it is enforced. The OECD points out that:

herein lies a major problem: in all OECD countries, enforcement essentially relies on the victims' willingness to assert their claims. But many people are not even aware of their legal rights regarding discrimination in the workplace. And even if they are, proving a discrimination claim is intrinsically difficult for the claimant and legal action in courts is a costly process, whose benefits down the road are often small and uncertain. All this discourages victims from lodging complaints.

Moreover, although many OECD countries have established specialized anti-discrimination agencies, only in a few are these agencies effectively empowered, in the absence of individual complaints, to investigate companies, take action against employers suspected of engaging in discriminatory practices, and sanction them when they find evidence of discrimination.

In 2003, the U.S. Government Accountability Office (GAO) found that, in 2000, women in the United States earned, on average, 80% of what men earned and that workplace discrimination may have been a contributing factor. In light of these findings, GAO examined the enforcement of anti-discrimination laws in the private and public sectors. In a 2008 report, GAO focused on the enforcement and outreach efforts of the Equal Employment Opportunity Commission (EEOC) and the Department of Labor (Labor). GAO found that EEOC does not fully monitor its gender pay enforcement efforts, and that Labor does not monitor enforcement trends and performance outcomes in gender pay or other specific areas of discrimination. GAO concluded that "federal agencies should better monitor their performance in enforcing anti-discrimination laws."

In 2016, the EEOC proposed a rule to submit more information on employee wages by gender to better monitor and combat gender discrimination. In 2018, Iceland enacted legislation to reduce the country's pay gap.

=== Awareness campaigns ===
Civil society groups organize awareness campaigns, including events such as Equal Pay Day and the equal pay for equal work movement, to raise public awareness of the gender pay gap. For the same reason, various groups publish regular reports on the current state of gender pay differences. An example is the Global Gender Gap Report.

=== Job flexibility ===
The growth of the "gig" economy generates worker flexibility that, some have speculated, will favor women. However, the analysis of earnings among more than one million Uber drivers in the United States surprisingly showed that the gender pay gap between drivers is about 7% in favor of men. Uber's algorithm does not distinguish workers' gender, but men earn more because they choose better times and areas to work, and cancel and accept trips more lucratively. Finally, men drive 2.2% faster than women, which also allows them to earn more per unit of time. The study concludes the "gig" economy can perpetuate the gender pay gap even in the absence of discrimination.

In 2020, researchers from Stanford University used data from more than one million Uber drivers to show that, despite female drivers earning 7% less than male drivers, this difference was "entirely attributed to three factors: experience on the platform (...), preferences and constraints over where to work (...), and preferences for driving speed"; they noted that their results " suggest that there is no reason to expect the "gig" economy to close gender differences. Even in the absence of discrimination and in flexible labor markets, women's relatively high opportunity cost of non-paid work time and gender-based differences in preferences and constraints can sustain a gender pay gap."

== Negative gender pay gap ==
In Luxembourg, a negative gender pay gap in unadjusted gross hourly earnings was observed at -0.9% in 2023, which indicates that, on average, women are paid more for each hour of work compared to men. For ages below 25, negative gender pay gaps were observed in Belgium (-8.3%), Greece (-4.4%), France (-7.2%), Malta (-2.0%) and Finland (-0.5%) for 2023, while for ages 25–34 negative gender pay gaps were observed in Belgium (-5.0) and Malta (-4.3%).

In the United Kingdom, a 2015 study compiled by the Press Association, based on data from the Office for National Statistics, revealed that women in their 20s were out-earning men in their 20s by an average of £1,111, reversing a previous trend. However, the same study showed that men in their 30s out-earned women in their 30s by an average of £8,775. The study did not attempt to explain the causes of the gender gap.

== By country ==
This is a plot of non-adjusted pay gaps (median earnings of full-time employees) according to the OECD.

Unadjusted gender pay gap of employees in OECD countries

Moreover, the World Economic Forum provides data from 2015 that evaluates the gender pay gap in 145 countries. Their evaluations take into account economic participation and opportunity, educational attainment, health and survival, and political empowerment scores.

=== Australia ===
In Australia, the Workplace Gender Equality Agency (WGEA), a statutory Australian Government agency, publishes data from non-public-sector Australian organizations. There is a pay gap across all industries. The gender pay gap is calculated on the average weekly ordinary time earnings for full-time employees published by the Australian Bureau of Statistics. The gender pay gap excludes part-time earnings, casual earnings, and increased hourly rates for overtime.

Australia has a persistent gender pay gap. Between 1990 and 2020, the gender pay gap remained within a range of between 13 and 19%. In November 2020, the Australian gender pay gap was 13.4%.

Ian Watson of Macquarie University examined the gender pay gap among full-time managers in Australia over the period 2001–2008 and found that a range of demographic and labor market variables could explain only 65-90% of this earnings differential. In fact, a "major part of the earnings gap is simply due to women managers being female". Watson also notes that despite the "characteristics of male and female managers being remarkably similar, their earnings are very different, suggesting that discrimination plays an important role in this outcome". A 2009 report to the Department of Families, Housing, Community Services and Indigenous Affairs also found that "simply being a woman is the major contributing factor to the gap in Australia, accounting for 60 per cent of the difference between women's and men's earnings, a finding which reflects other Australian research in this area". The second most important factor in explaining the pay gap was industrial segregation. A report by the World Bank also found that women in Australia who worked part-time jobs and were married came from households which had a gendered distribution of labor, possessed high job satisfaction, and hence were not motivated to increase their working hours.

=== Brazil ===
The Global Gender Gap Report ranks Brazil at 95 out of 144 countries on pay equality for like jobs. Brazil has a score of 0.684, which is a little below 2017's global index. In 2017, Brazil was one of the 6 countries that fully closed their gaps on both the Health and Survival and Educational Attainment sub-indexes. However, Brazil saw a setback in the progress towards gender parity this year, with its overall gender gap standing at its widest point since 2011. This is due to an exponential growth of Brazil's Political Empowerment gender gap, which measures the ratio of females in the parliament and at a ministerial level, that is too large to be counterbalanced by a range of modest improvements across the country's Economic Participation and Opportunity sub-index.

According to the Brazilian Institute of Geography and Statistics, or IBGE, women in Brazil study more, work more, and earn less than men. On average, when combining paid work, household chores, and caregiving, women work 3 hours more per week than men. In fact, the average woman will work 54.4 hours per week, while the average man will work only 51.4 hours per week. Despite higher educational attainment, women earn, on average, less than men. Although the difference between men's and women's earnings has declined in recent years, in 2016, women still earned 76.5% of men's earnings. One factor that may explain this difference is that only 37.8% of management positions in 2016 were held by women. According to IBGE, occupational segregation and the wage discrimination of women in the labor market also have an important role in the wage difference between men and women. According to data from the Continuous National Household Sample Survey, done by IBGE in the fourth quarter of 2017, 24.3% of the 40.2 million Brazilian workers had completed college, but this proportion was of 14.6% among employed men. As reported by the same survey, women who work earn 24.4% less, on average, than men. It also cited that 6.0% of working men were employers, while the proportion of women employers was only 3.3%. The survey also pointed out that 92.3% of domestic workers, a job culturally known as "feminine" and that pays low wages, are women. High-paying occupations like civil construction employed 13% of employed men and only 0.5% of employed women. Another reason that might explain the gender wage gap in Brazil is the very strict labor regulations that increase informal hiring. In Brazil, under the law, female workers may take 6 months of maternity leave, which must be fully paid by the employer. Many researchers are concerned with these regulations. They question whether these regulations may actually force workers into informal jobs, where they will have no rights at all. In fact, women who work in informal jobs earn only 50% of the average earnings of women in formal jobs. Between men, the difference is less radical: men working in informal jobs earn 60% of the average for men in formal jobs.

=== Canada ===
A study of wages among Canadian supply chain managers found that women make an average of $14,296 a year less than men. Similarly, a study in the healthcare sector found that women health managers earn 12% less than men at the middle-level and 20% less at the senior level, after adjusting statistically for age, education and other characteristics. The research further suggests that as skilled professionals move up the management pipeline, they are less likely to be female. Women in Canada are also more likely to be found in low-wage work compared to men. There remains the question of why such a trend seems to resonate throughout the developed world. One identified societal factor is the influx of women of colour and immigrants into the workforce. These groups both tend to be employed in lower-paying jobs statistically. Each province and territory in Canada has a quasi-constitutional human rights code which prohibits discrimination based on sex. Several also have laws that specifically prohibit public sector and private sector employers from paying men and women different amounts for substantially similar work. Verbatim, the Alberta Human Rights Act states regarding equal pay, "Where employees of both sexes perform the same or substantially similar work for an employer in an establishment, the employer shall pay the employees at the same rate of pay." However, pay equity policies do not adequately address gender bias and the tendency for women to be clustered into jobs and sectors that pay less than men despite similarity in skills, qualifications, working conditions and levels of responsibility.

=== China ===
Using the gaps between men and women in economic participation and opportunity, educational attainment, health and survival, and political empowerment, The Global Gender Gap Report 2018 ranks China's gender gap at 110 out of 145 countries. As an upper middle income country, as classified by the World Bank, China is the "third-least improved country in the world" on the gender gap. The health and survival sub-index is the lowest within the countries listed; this sub-index takes into account the gender differences of life expectancy and sex ratio at birth (the ratio of male to female children to depict the preferences of sons in accordance with China's One Child Policy). In particular, Jayoung Yoon, a researcher, claims the women's employment rate is decreasing. However, several of the contributing factors might be expected to increase women's participation. Yoon's contributing factors include: traditional gender roles; the lack of state-provided childcare services; the challenges of child-rearing; and highly educated, unmarried women termed "leftover women" by the state. The term "leftover women" produces anxieties for women to rush into marriage, delaying employment. In line with traditional gender roles, the government's "Women Return to the Home" movement encouraged women to leave their jobs to reduce the unemployment rate among men.

=== Dominican Republic ===
Dominican women, who make up 52.2% of the labor force, earn an average of 20,479 Dominican pesos, 2.6% more than the average income of Dominican men, 19,961 pesos. The Global Gender Gap ranking, found by compiling economic participation and opportunity, educational attainment, health and survival, and political empowerment scores, in 2009 it was 67th out of 134 countries representing 90% of the globe, and its ranking has dropped to 86th out of 145 countries in 2015. More women are in ministerial offices, improving the political empowerment score, but women are not receiving equal pay for similar jobs, preserving the low economic participation and opportunity scores.

=== European Union ===
At the EU level, the gender pay gap is defined as the relative difference in the average gross hourly earnings of women and men within the economy as a whole. Eurostat found a persisting gender pay gap of 17.5% on average in the 27 EU Member States in 2008. There were considerable differences between the Member States, with the non-adjusted pay gap ranging from less than 10% in Italy, Slovenia, Malta, Romania, Belgium, Portugal, and Poland to more than 20% in Slovakia, the Netherlands, Czech Republic, Cyprus, Germany, United Kingdom, and Greece and more than 25% in Estonia and Austria. However, taking into account the hours worked in Finland, men there only earned 0.4% more in net income than women.

A recent survey of international employment law firms showed that gender pay gap reporting is not a common policy internationally. Despite such laws at the national level being few and far between, there are calls for EU-level regulation. A recent resolution (as of December 2015) of the European Parliament urged the commission to table legislation to close the pay gap. A proposal that is substantively the same as the UK plan was passed by 344 votes to 156 in the European Parliament.

The European Commission has stated that the undervaluation of female work is one of the main contributors to the persisting gender pay gap. They add that explanations of the pay gap go beyond discrimination, and that other factors contribute to upholding the gap: factors such as work-life balance, the issue of women in leadership and the glass ceiling, and sectoral segregation, which has to do with the overrepresentation of women in low-paying sectors.

==== Finland ====
On average, between 1995 and 2005, women in Finland earned 28.4% less in non-adjusted salaries than men. Taking into account the high progressive tax rate in Finland, the net income difference was 22.7%. Adjusted for the amount of hours worked (and not including unpaid national military service hours), these wage differences are reduced to approximately 5.7% (non-taxed) and 0.4% (tax-adjusted).

The difference in the amount of hours worked is largely attributed to social factors; for example, women in Finland spend considerably more time on domestic work instead. Other important factors are increased pay rates for overtime and evening/night-time work, of which men in Finland, on average, work more. When comparing people with the same job title, women in public sector positions earn approximately 99% of their male counterparts, while those in the private sector only earn 95%. Public sector positions are generally more rigidly defined, allowing for less negotiation in individual wages and overtime/evening/night-time work.

As of 2018, Finland was ranked fourth and had fully closed the gender gap on educational attainment, and had closed more than 82% of its overall gender gap.

==== Germany ====
Activists demonstrate for Equal Pay Day in Frankfurt.

Women earn 22–23% less than men, according to the Federal Statistical Office of Germany. The revised gender pay gap was 6–8% during 2006–2013. The Cologne Institute for Economic Research adjusted the wage gap to less than 2%. They reduced the gender pay gap from 25% to 11% by accounting for hours worked, education, and length of employment. The revenue gap was further reduced if women had not paused their careers for more than 18 months due to motherhood.

The most significant factors associated with the remaining gender pay gap are part-time work, education and occupational segregation (less women in leading positions and in fields like STEM).

In 2017, Germany passed the Transparency in Wage Structures Act, which requires larger employers to publish information on gender pay gaps and gives employees the right to information about their salaries relative to members of the opposite gender.

Six years later, the gender pay gap remains a significant issue. In 2023, women earned, on average, 18% less per hour than men, with the gap smaller in East Germany than in West Germany. This disparity reflects differences in sectoral employment, working hours, and career progression between men and women. In 2025, the unadjusted gap was 16%, unchanged from 2025, while the adjusted gap was 6%. Compared to other European Union countries, Germany has a relatively large gender pay gap. Factors contributing to this include a higher prevalence of part-time work among women, occupational segregation, differences in educational fields, and limited access to senior management positions. The pay gap also varies by age and educational attainment. Research shows that the gender pay gap widens with age and remains evident across all levels of education, suggesting that long-term career patterns and structural inequalities play a significant role in wage disparities. The adjusted gender pay gap, after controlling for job-related characteristics, is substantially smaller, but still present.

One of the strongest determinants of the gender pay gap in Germany identified in research is parenthood. Studies show that women experience a significant wage disadvantage because many reduce their working hours or temporarily leave the labor market after having children. This leads to long-term income losses and slower career progression. Fathers typically do not face comparable wage reductions and tend to return more quickly to full-time employment. Differences in parental leave uptake reinforce this divide. In 2022, mothers accounted for almost 90% of all parental leave months, while fathers took substantially shorter periods on average. Moreover, wage inequality varies across sectors. Industries with strong collective bargaining coverage, such as the public sector, show a smaller gender pay gap. Private-sector industries with individualized wage-setting tend to exhibit larger disparities.

==== Ireland ====
In Ireland, the average gender pay gap in 2022 was 9.3%. The Gender Pay Gap Information Act 2021 required all companies with more than 250 employees to publish annual gender pay gap reports, detailing mean and median gender pay gaps, bonus gaps, and information about gender representation within pay quartiles. In 2024, companies with more than 150 employees were included in the legislation. In 2025, all companies with 50 or more employees must report.

When the gender pay gap legislation was introduced, the government stated that it would build a central portal to store the data, but this portal has not yet been delivered; no date has been communicated for its delivery as of November 2023.

The quality of the published reports has varied widely, with many containing significant errors and missing data.

==== Luxembourg ====
In Luxembourg, the total gender income gap represents 32.5%. The gender pay gap of full-time workers regarding monthly gross wages has narrowed over the past few years. According to data from the OECD (Organization for Economic Co-operation and Development), the gender pay gap narrowed by over 10% between 2002 and 2015. The gap is also dependent on the age group. Females between the ages of 25 and 34 earn higher wages than males in this age group. One reason is that they have a higher level of education at this age. From age 35 onward, males earn higher salaries than females.

The current extent of the gender pay gap is due to factors such as differing working hours and varying labor market participation. More females (30.4%) than males (4.6%) are working part-time, due to this fact the overall working hours for females are lowered. The labor force participation represents 60.3% for females and 76% for males, because most women will take advantage of the maternity leave. Males participate more often in higher-paid jobs, for instance, in executive positions (93.7%), which affects the scale of the gender pay gap as well.

There is also a gender gap in vocational degree (12%) and apprentice training (3.4%) in Luxembourg.

==== Netherlands ====
In the Netherlands, recent figures from the CBS (Centraal Bureau voor de Statistiek; Central Bureau of Statistics) indicate that the pay gap is narrowing. Adjusted for occupation level, education level, experience level, and 17 other variables, the earnings gap between businesses and government has narrowed from 9% (2008) to 7% (2014) in businesses and from 7% (2008) to 5% (2014) in government. Without adjustments, the gap is 20% for businesses (2014) and 10% for the government (2014). Young women earn more than men until age 30; this is mostly due to higher levels of education. Women in the Netherlands up to age 30 have a higher average educational level than men; after age 30, men have a higher average educational level. The chance can also be caused by women getting pregnant and starting to take part-time jobs so they can care for the children.

=== India ===
In 2013, the gender pay gap in India was estimated at 24.81%. Further, while analyzing the level of female participation in the economy, a report slots India as one of the bottom 10 countries on its list. Thus, in addition to unequal pay, there is also unequal representation; while women constitute almost half the Indian population (about 48% of the total), their representation in the workforce is only about one-fourth of the total.

=== Japan ===
Jayoung Yoon analyzes Japan's culture of the traditional male-breadwinner model, in which the husband works outside the home while the wife is the caretaker. Despite traditional gender roles for women, Japan's government aims to boost the economy by improving labor policies for mothers as part of Abenomics, an economic revitalization strategy. Yoon believes Abenomics reflects a desire to address the effects of an aging population rather than to promote gender equality. Evidence for the conclusion is the finding that women are entering the workforce in contingent positions for secondary income and that companies need part-time workers due to mechanization, outsourcing, and subcontracting. Therefore, Yoon states that women's participation rates do not seem to be influenced by government policies but by companies' necessities. The Global Gender Gap Report 2015 said that Japan's economic participation and opportunity ranking (106th), 145th being the broadest gender gap, dropped from 2014 "due to lower wage equality for similar work and fewer female legislators, senior officials and managers".

=== Jordan ===
Based on a total of 145 states, the World Economic Forum ranks Jordan's gender gap for 2015 as 140th, based on evaluations of economic participation and opportunity, educational attainment, health and survival, and political empowerment. Jordan is the "world's second-least improved country" for the overall gender gap. The ranking dropped from 93rd in 2006. In contradiction to Jordan's provisions within its constitution and being signatory to multiple conventions for improving the gender pay gap, there is no legislation aimed at gender equality in the workforce. According to The Global Gender Gap Report 2015, Jordan had a score of 0.61; 1.00 being equality, on pay equality for like jobs.

=== Korea ===
As stated by Jayoung Yoon, South Korea's female employment rate has increased since the 1997 Asian financial crisis due to women aged 25 to 34 leaving the workforce later to have children and women aged 45 to 49 returning to the workforce. Mothers are more likely to continue working after child-rearing due to the availability of affordable childcare services for mothers previously in the workforce, or the difficulty of being rehired after taking time off to raise their children. The World Economic Forum found that in 2015, South Korea had a score of 0.55 (1.00 being equality) for pay equality for like jobs. Among 145 countries, South Korea ranked 115th (lower rankings indicate a narrower gender gap). On the other hand, political empowerment dropped to half of the percentage of women in the government in 2014.

In 2018, the gender wage gap in South Korea is of 34.6%, and women earned about 65.4% of what men did on average, according to OECD data. With regards to monthly earnings, including part-time jobs, the gender gap can be explained primarily by the fact that women work fewer hours than men, but occupation and industry segregation also play an important role. Korea is considered to have the worst wage gap among the industrialized countries. This gap is often overlooked. In addition, as many women leave the workplace once married or pregnant, the gender gap in pension entitlements is affected too, which in turn impacts the poverty level.

North Korea, on the other hand, is one of the few countries where women earn more than men. The disparity is due to women's greater participation in the shadow economy of North Korea.

=== New Zealand ===
Although recent studies have shown that the gender wage gap in New Zealand has diminished in the last two decades, the gap continues to affect many women today. According to StatsNZ, the wage gap was measured to be 9.4 percent in September 2017. Back in 1998, it was measured to be approximately 16.3 percent. Several factors affect New Zealand's wage gap. However, researchers claim that 80 percent of these factors cannot be elucidated, which often causes difficulty in understanding the gap.

To calculate the gap, New Zealand uses several methods. The official gap is calculated by Statistics New Zealand. They use the difference between men's and women's hourly revenue. On the other hand, the State Services Commission uses the average income of men and women in its calculations. Over the years, the OECD has tracked, and continues to track, New Zealand's gender wage gap, along with those of 34 other countries. In fact, the overall goal of the OECD is to fix the wage gap so that gender no longer plays a significant role in an individual's income. Although it has been a gradual change, New Zealand is one of the countries that has seen notable progress and researchers have predicted that it will continue to do so.

=== Russia ===
A wage gap exists in Russia (both before and after 1991), and statistical analysis shows that most of it cannot be explained by women's lower qualifications compared to men. On the other hand, occupational segregation by gender and labor market discrimination seem to account for a large share of it.

The October Revolution (1917) and the dissolution of the Soviet Union in 1991 have shaped the developments in the gender wage gap. These two main turning points in the Russian history frame the analysis of Russia's gender pay gap found in the economic literature. Consequently, the pay gap study can be examined for two periods: the wage gap in Soviet Russia (1917–1991) and the wage gap in the transition and post-transition (after 1991).

=== Singapore ===
According to Jayoung Yoon, Singapore's aging population and low fertility rates are leading more women to join the labor force in response to the government's efforts to boost the economy. The government provides tax relief to mothers in the workforce to encourage them to continue working. Yoon states that "as female employment increases, the gender gap in employment rates...narrows down" in Singapore. The Global Gender Gap Report 2015 ranks Singapore's gender gap at 54th out of 145 states globally based on the economic participation and opportunity, the educational attainment, the health and survival, and the political empowerment sub-indexes (a lower rank means a smaller gender gap). The gender gap narrowed from 2014's ranking of 59. In the Asia and Pacific region, Singapore has evolved the most in the economic participation and opportunity sub-index, yet it is lower than the region's mean in educational attainment and political empowerment.

=== United Kingdom ===
As of April 2022, the average gender pay gap is 8.3%, although men get paid less than women for part-time work. The gap varies considerably from −4.4% (women employed part-time without overtime out-earn men) to 26% (for UK women employed full-time aged 50 – 59). In 2012, the pay gap officially dropped below 10% for full-time workers. The median pay, the point at which half of people earn more and half earn less, is 17.9% less for employed women than for employed men.

The most significant factors associated with the gender pay gap are full-time versus part-time work, education, the size of the firm where a person is employed, and occupational segregation (women are underrepresented in managerial and high-paying professional occupations). In part-time roles women out-earn men by 4.4% in 2018 (6.5% in 2015, 5.5% in 2014). Women workers qualified to GCSE or A level standard experienced a smaller pay gap in 2018. (Those qualified to degree level have seen little change).

In October 2014, the UK Equality Act 2010 was augmented with regulations which require Employment Tribunals to order an employer (except an existing micro-business or a new business) to carry out an equal pay audit where the employer is found to have breached equal pay law. The then prime minister David Cameron announced plans to require large firms to disclose data on the gender pay gap among staff. Since April 2018, employers with over 250 employees are legally required to publish data relating to pay inequalities. Published data include pay and bonus figures for men and women, and cover April 2017.

A BBC analysis of the figures after the deadline expired showed that more than three-quarters of UK companies pay men more on average than women. Employment barrister Harini Iyengar advocates more flexible working and greater paternity leave to achieve economic and cultural change.

=== United States ===
Retired footballer Brandi Chastain talking about the importance of equal pay regarding the U.S. women's national soccer team pay discrimination claim in 2019

In the US, women's average annual salary has been estimated as 78% to 83% of that of men's average salary. Across racial categories, women of every racial or ethnic group earn less than men of the same group. Beyond overt discrimination, multiple studies explain the gender pay gap in terms of women's higher participation in part-time work and long-term absences from the labor market due to care responsibilities such as motherhood penalty, among other factors. In 2023, research at PayScale showed that women's average pay as a percent of men's increased from 83% to 99% when controlling for job title, education, experience, industry, job level, and hours worked. Similar research from Glassdoor in 2019 found an unadjusted figure of 79% and an adjusted figure of 95%.

More recently, however, the gender wage gap has increased in the United States. In 2023, women's earnings declined by 3 cents relative to men's, in all age groups. In 2022, childless men aged 25–34 earned significantly more than childless women of the same age group when stratified by educational attainment. Among all 25-34 year olds in 2022, both women and men with no children at home earned 97% of the median hourly earnings of men with children at home, while women with children at home earned 85%.

== Remote workforce ==
In the United States, the gender pay gap is about 10 cents bigger in the remote workforce than in the non-remote workforce, according to a report by PayScale. The report found that in the remote workforce, women earned 79% of what men did, compared to 89% in the non-remote workforce. A 2023 United Kingdom survey found that managers were 15% less likely to give promotions to women who work remotely compared to the office, and were 30% less likely to give promotions to men verbatim.

== See also ==
- Economic inequality
- Feminization of poverty
- Gender inequality
- Gender pay gap in medicine
- Gender pension gap
- Glass ceiling
- Global Gender Gap Report
- Income inequality metrics
- International inequality
- Lowell Mill Girls
- Material feminism

For other wage gaps

- Gay wage gap
- Racial wage gap in the United States
