= Causal model =

Conceptual model in philosophy of science

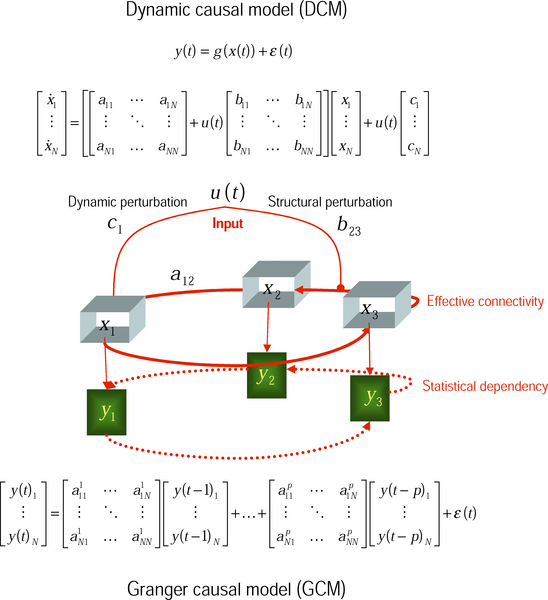
Comparison of two competing causal models (DCM, GCM) used for interpretation of fMRI images

In metaphysics and statistics, a causal model (also called a structural causal model) is a conceptual model that represents the causal mechanisms of a system. Causal models often employ formal causal notation, such as structural equation modeling or causal directed acyclic graphs (DAGs), to describe relationships among variables and to guide inference.

By clarifying which variables should be included, excluded, or controlled for, causal models can improve the design of empirical studies and the interpretation of results. They can also enable researchers to answer some causal questions using observational data, reducing the need for interventional studies such as randomized controlled trials.

In cases where randomized experiments are impractical or unethical—for example, when studying the effects of environmental exposures or social determinants of health—causal models provide a framework for drawing valid conclusions from non-experimental data.

Causal models can help with the question of external validity (whether results from one study apply to unstudied populations). Causal models can allow data from multiple studies to be merged (in certain circumstances) to answer questions that cannot be answered by any individual data set.

Causal models have found applications in signal processing, epidemiology, machine learning, cultural studies, and urbanism, and they can describe both linear and nonlinear processes.

== Definition ==
Causal models are mathematical models representing causal relationships within an individual system or population. They facilitate inferences about causal relationships from statistical data. They can teach us a good deal about the epistemology of causation, and about the relationship between causation and probability. They have also been applied to topics of interest to philosophers, such as the logic of counterfactuals, decision theory, and the analysis of actual causation.

— Stanford Encyclopedia of Philosophy

Judea Pearl defines a causal model as an ordered triple $\langle U, V, E\rangle$, where U is a set of exogenous variables whose values are determined by factors outside the model; V is a set of endogenous variables whose values are determined by factors within the model; and E is a set of structural equations that express the value of each endogenous variable as a function of the values of the other variables in U and V.

== History ==
Aristotle defined a taxonomy of causality, including material, formal, efficient and final causes. Hume rejected Aristotle's taxonomy in favor of counterfactuals. At one point, he denied that objects have "powers" that make one a cause and another an effect. Later he adopted "if the first object had not been, the second had never existed" ("but-for" causation).

In the late 19th century, the discipline of statistics began to form. After a years-long effort to identify causal rules for domains such as biological inheritance, Galton introduced the concept of mean regression (epitomized by the sophomore slump in sports) which later led him to the non-causal concept of correlation.

As a positivist, Pearson expunged the notion of causality from much of science as an unprovable special case of association and introduced the correlation coefficient as the metric of association. He wrote, "Force as a cause of motion is exactly the same as a tree god as a cause of growth" and that causation was only a "fetish among the inscrutable arcana of modern science". Pearson founded Biometrika and the Biometrics Lab at University College London, which became the world leader in statistics.

In 1908 Hardy and Weinberg solved the problem of trait stability that had led Galton to abandon causality, by resurrecting Mendelian inheritance.

In 1921 Wright's path analysis became the theoretical ancestor of causal modeling and causal graphs. He developed this approach while attempting to untangle the relative impacts of heredity, development and environment on guinea pig coat patterns. He backed up his then-heretical claims by showing how such analyses could explain the relationship between guinea pig birth weight, in utero time and litter size. Opposition to these ideas by prominent statisticians led them to be ignored for the following 40 years (except among animal breeders). Instead scientists relied on correlations, partly at the behest of Wright's critic (and leading statistician), Fisher. One exception was Burks, a student who in 1926 was the first to apply path diagrams to represent a mediating influence (mediator) and to assert that holding a mediator constant induces errors. She may have invented path diagrams independently.

In 1923, Neyman introduced the concept of a potential outcome, but his paper was not translated from Polish to English until 1990.

In 1958 Cox warned that controlling for a variable Z is valid only if it is highly unlikely to be affected by independent variables.

In the 1960s, Duncan, Blalock, Goldberger and others rediscovered path analysis. While reading Blalock's work on path diagrams, Duncan remembered a lecture by Ogburn twenty years earlier that mentioned a paper by Wright that in turn mentioned Burks.

Sociologists originally called causal models structural equation modeling, but once it became a rote method, it lost its utility, leading some practitioners to reject any relationship to causality. Economists adopted the algebraic part of path analysis, calling it simultaneous equation modeling. However, economists still avoided attributing causal meaning to their equations.

Sixty years after his first paper, Wright published a piece that recapitulated it, following Karlin et al.'s critique, which objected that it handled only linear relationships and that robust, model-free presentations of data were more revealing.

In 1973 Lewis advocated replacing correlation with but-for causality (counterfactuals). He referred to humans' ability to envision alternative worlds in which a cause did or not occur, and in which an effect appeared only following its cause. In 1974 Rubin introduced the notion of "potential outcomes" as a language for asking causal questions.

In 1983 Cartwright proposed that any factor that is "causally relevant" to an effect be conditioned on, moving beyond simple probability as the only guide.

In 1986 Baron and Kenny introduced principles for detecting and evaluating mediation in a system of linear equations. As of 2014 their paper was the 33rd most-cited of all time. That year Greenland and Robins introduced the "exchangeability" approach to handling confounding by considering a counterfactual. They proposed assessing what would have happened to the treatment group if they had not received the treatment and comparing that outcome to that of the control group. If they matched, confounding was said to be absent.

== Ladder of causation ==
Pearl's causal metamodel involves a three-level abstraction he calls the ladder of causation. The lowest level, Association (seeing/observing), entails the sensing of regularities or patterns in the input data, expressed as correlations. The middle level, Intervention (doing), predicts the effects of deliberate actions, expressed as causal relationships. The highest level, Counterfactuals (imagining), involves constructing a theory of (part of) the world that explains why specific actions have specific effects and what happens in the absence of such actions.

=== Association ===
One object is associated with another if observing one changes the probability of observing the other. Example: shoppers who buy toothpaste are more likely to also buy dental floss. Mathematically:

$$P (\mathrm{floss} | \mathrm{toothpaste})$$

or the probability of (purchasing) floss given (the purchase of) toothpaste. Associations can also be measured via computing the correlation of the two events. Associations have no causal implications. One event could cause the other, the reverse could be true, or both events could be caused by some third event (unhappy hygienist shames shopper into treating their mouth better ).

=== Intervention ===
This level asserts specific causal relationships between events. Causality is assessed by experimentally performing some action that affects one of the events. Example: after doubling the price of toothpaste, what would be the new probability of purchasing? Causality cannot be established by examining history (of price changes) because the price change may have been for some other reason that could itself affect the second event (a tariff that increases the price of both goods). Mathematically:

$$P (\mathrm{floss} | do(\mathrm{toothpaste}))$$

where do is an operator that signals the experimental intervention (doubling the price). The operator indicates performing the minimal change in the world necessary to create the intended effect, a "mini-surgery" on the model with as little change from reality as possible.

=== Counterfactuals ===
The highest level, counterfactual, involves consideration of an alternate version of a past event, or what would happen under different circumstances for the same experimental unit. For example, what is the probability that, if a store had doubled the price of floss, the toothpaste-purchasing shopper would still have bought it?

$$P (\mathrm{floss} | \mathrm{toothpaste}, 2*\mathrm{price})$$

Counterfactuals can indicate the existence of a causal relationship. Models that can answer counterfactuals allow precise interventions whose consequences can be predicted. At the extreme, such models are accepted as physical laws (as in the laws of physics, e.g., inertia, which says that if force is not applied to a stationary object, it will not move).

== Causality ==
=== Causality vs correlation ===
Statistics revolves around the analysis of relationships among multiple variables. Traditionally, these relationships are described as correlations, associations without any implied causal relationships. Causal models attempt to extend this framework by adding the notion of causal relationships, in which changes in one variable cause changes in others.

Twentieth century definitions of causality relied purely on probabilities/associations. One event ($X$) was said to cause another if it raises the probability of the other ($Y$). Mathematically this is expressed as:

$$P (Y| X) > P(Y)$$.

Such definitions are inadequate because other relationships (e.g., a common cause for $X$ and $Y$) can satisfy the condition. Causality is relevant to the second ladder step. Associations are on the first step and provide only evidence to the latter.

A later definition attempted to address this ambiguity by conditioning on background factors. Mathematically:

$$P (Y | X, K = k) > P(Y|K=k)$$,

where $K$ is the set of background variables and $k$ represents the values of those variables in a specific context. However, the required set of background variables is indeterminate (multiple sets may increase the probability), as long as probability is the only criterion.

Other attempts to define causality include Granger causality, a statistical hypothesis test that causality (in economics) can be assessed by measuring the ability to predict the future values of one time series using prior values of another time series.

=== Types ===
A cause can be necessary, sufficient, contributory or some combination.

==== Necessary ====
For x to be a necessary cause of y, the presence of y must imply the prior occurrence of x. The presence of x, however, does not imply that y will occur. Necessary causes are also known as "but-for" causes, as in y would not have occurred but for the occurrence of x.

==== Sufficient causes ====
For x to be a sufficient cause of y, the presence of x must imply the subsequent occurrence of y. However, another cause z may independently cause y. Thus the presence of y does not require the prior occurrence of x.

==== Contributory causes ====
For x to be a contributory cause of y, the presence of x must increase the likelihood of y. If the likelihood is 100%, then x is instead called sufficient. A contributory cause may also be necessary.

== Model ==
=== Causal diagram ===
A causal diagram is a directed graph that displays causal relationships between variables in a causal model. A causal diagram includes a set of variables (or nodes). Each node is connected by an arrow to one or more other nodes upon which it has a causal influence. An arrowhead delineates the direction of causality, e.g., an arrow connecting variables $A$ and $B$ with the arrowhead at $B$ indicates that a change in $A$ causes a change in $B$ (with an associated probability). A path is a traversal of the graph between two nodes following causal arrows.

Causal diagrams include causal loop diagrams, directed acyclic graphs, and Ishikawa diagrams.

Causal diagrams are independent of the quantitative probabilities that inform them. Changes to those probabilities (e.g., due to technological improvements) do not require changes to the model.

=== Model elements ===
Causal models have formal structures with elements with specific properties.

==== Junction patterns ====
The three types of connections of three nodes are linear chains, branching forks and merging colliders.

===== Chain =====
Chains are straight line connections with arrows pointing from cause to effect. In this model, $B$ is a mediator in that it mediates the change that $A$ would otherwise have on $C$.

$$A \rightarrow B \rightarrow C$$

===== Fork =====
In forks, one cause has multiple effects. The two effects have a common cause. There exists a (non-causal) spurious correlation between $A$ and $C$ that can be eliminated by conditioning on $B$ (for a specific value of $B$).

$$A \leftarrow B \rightarrow C$$

"Conditioning on $B$" means "given $B$" (i.e., given a value of $B$).

An elaboration of a fork is the confounder:

$$A \leftarrow B \rightarrow C \rightarrow A$$

In such models, $B$ is a common cause of $A$ and $C$ (which also causes $A$), making $B$ the confounder.

===== Collider =====
In colliders, multiple causes affect one outcome. Conditioning on $B$ (for a specific value of $B$) often reveals a non-causal negative correlation between $A$ and $C$. This negative correlation has been called collider bias and the "explain-away" effect as $B$ explains away the correlation between $A$ and $C$. The correlation can be positive in the case where contributions from both $A$ and $C$ are necessary to affect $B$.

$$A \rightarrow B \leftarrow C$$

==== Node types ====
===== Mediator =====
A mediator node modifies the effect of other causes on an outcome (as opposed to simply affecting the outcome). For example, in the chain example above, $B$ is a mediator, because it modifies the effect of $A$ (an indirect cause of $C$) on $C$ (the outcome).

===== Confounder =====
A confounder node affects multiple outcomes, creating a positive correlation among them.

==== Instrumental variable ====
An instrumental variable is one that:

- has a path to the outcome;
- has no other path to causal variables;
- has no direct influence on the outcome.

Regression coefficients can serve as estimates of the causal effect of an instrumental variable on an outcome as long as that effect is not confounded. In this way, instrumental variables allow causal factors to be quantified without data on confounders.

For example, given the model:

$$Z \rightarrow X \rightarrow Y \leftarrow U \rightarrow X$$

$Z$ is an instrumental variable, because it has a path to the outcome $Y$ and is unconfounded, e.g., by $U$.

In the above example, if $Z$ and $X$ take binary values, then the assumption that $Z = 0, X = 1$ does not occur is called monotonicity.

Refinements to the technique include creating an instrument by conditioning on other variable to block the paths between the instrument and the confounder and combining multiple variables to form a single instrument.

==== Mendelian randomization ====
Definition: Mendelian randomization uses measured variation in genes of known function to examine the causal effect of a modifiable exposure on disease in observational studies.

Because genes vary randomly across populations, presence of a gene typically qualifies as an instrumental variable, implying that in many cases, causality can be quantified using regression on an observational study.

== Associations ==
=== Independence conditions ===
Independence conditions are rules for deciding whether two variables are independent of each other. Variables are independent if the values of one do not directly affect the values of the other. Multiple causal models can share independence conditions. For example, the models

$$A \rightarrow B \rightarrow C$$

and

$$A \leftarrow B \rightarrow C$$

have the same independence conditions, because conditioning on $B$ leaves $A$ and $C$ independent. However, the two models do not have the same meaning and can be falsified based on data (that is, if observational data show an association between $A$ and $C$ after conditioning on $B$, then both models are incorrect). Conversely, data cannot show which of these two models are correct, because they have the same independence conditions.

Conditioning on a variable is a mechanism for conducting hypothetical experiments. Conditioning on a variable involves analyzing the values of other variables for a given value of the conditioned variable. In the first example, conditioning on $B$ implies that observations for a given value of $B$ should show no dependence between $A$ and $C$. If such a dependence exists, then the model is incorrect. Non-causal models cannot make such distinctions, because they do not make causal assertions.

=== Confounder/deconfounder ===
An essential element of correlational study design is to identify potentially confounding influences on the variable under study, such as demographics. These variables are controlled for to eliminate those influences. However, the correct list of confounding variables cannot be determined a priori. It is thus possible that a study may control for irrelevant variables or even (indirectly) the variable under study.

Causal models offer a robust technique for identifying appropriate confounding variables. Formally, Z is a confounder if "Y is associated with Z via paths not going through X". These can often be determined using data collected for other studies. Mathematically, if

$$P(Y|X) \ne P(Y|do(X))$$

X and Y are confounded (by some confounder variable Z).

Earlier, allegedly incorrect definitions of confounder include:

- "Any variable that is correlated with both X and Y."
- Y is associated with Z among the unexposed.
- Noncollapsibility: A difference between the "crude relative risk and the relative risk resulting after adjustment for the potential confounder".
- Epidemiological: A variable associated with X in the population at large and associated with Y among people unexposed to X.

The latter is flawed in that given that in the model:

$$X \rightarrow Z \rightarrow Y$$

Z matches the definition, but is a mediator, not a confounder, and is an example of controlling for the outcome.

In the model

$$X \leftarrow A \rightarrow B \leftarrow C \rightarrow Y$$

Traditionally, B was considered to be a confounder, because it is associated with X and with Y but is not on a causal path nor is it a descendant of anything on a causal path. Controlling for B causes it to become a confounder. This is known as M-bias.

==== Backdoor adjustment ====
For analysing the causal effect of X on Y in a causal model all confounder variables must be addressed (deconfounding). To identify the set of confounders, (1) every noncausal path between X and Y must be blocked by this set; (2) without disrupting any causal paths; and (3) without creating any spurious paths.

Definition: a backdoor path from variable X to Y is any path from X to Y that starts with an arrow pointing to X.

Definition: Given an ordered pair of variables (X,Y) in a model, a set of confounder variables Z satisfies the backdoor criterion if (1) no confounder variable Z is a descendent of X and (2) all backdoor paths between X and Y are blocked by the set of confounders.

If the backdoor criterion is satisfied for (X,Y), X and Y are deconfounded by the set of confounder variables. It is not necessary to control for any variables other than the confounders. The backdoor criterion is a sufficient but not necessary condition to find a set of variables Z to decounfound the analysis of the causal effect of X on y.

When the causal model is a plausible representation of reality and the backdoor criterion is satisfied, then partial regression coefficients can be used as (causal) path coefficients (for linear relationships).

$P(Y|do(X)) = \textstyle \sum_{z} \displaystyle P(Y|X, Z=z) P(Z=z)$

==== Frontdoor adjustment ====
If the elements of a blocking path are all unobservable, the backdoor path is not calculable, but if all forward paths from $X\to Y$ have elements $z$ where no open paths connect $z\to Y$, then $Z$, the set of all $z$s, can measure $P(Y|do(X))$. Effectively, there are conditions where $Z$ can act as a proxy for $X$.

Definition: a frontdoor path is a direct causal path for which data is available for all $z\in Z$, $Z$ intercepts all directed paths $X$ to $Y$, there are no unblocked paths from $Z$ to $Y$, and all backdoor paths from $Z$ to $Y$ are blocked by $X$.

The following converts a do expression into a do-free expression by conditioning on the variables along the front-door path.

$$P(Y|do(X)) = \textstyle \sum_{z} \left[\displaystyle P(Z=z|X) \textstyle \sum_{x} \displaystyle P(Y|X=x, Z=z) P(X=x)\right]$$

Presuming data for these observable probabilities is available, the ultimate probability can be computed without an experiment, regardless of the existence of other confounding paths and without backdoor adjustment.

== Interventions ==
=== Queries ===
Queries are questions asked based on a specific model. They are generally answered via performing experiments (interventions). Interventions take the form of fixing the value of one variable in a model and observing the result. Mathematically, such queries take the form (from the example):

$$P (\text{floss} \vline do(\text{toothpaste}))$$

where the do operator indicates that the experiment explicitly modified the price of toothpaste. Graphically, this blocks any causal factors that would otherwise affect that variable. Diagrammatically, this erases all causal arrows pointing at the experimental variable.

More complex queries are possible, in which the do operator is applied (the value is fixed) to multiple variables.

=== Do calculus ===
The do calculus is the set of manipulations that are available to transform one expression into another, with the general goal of transforming expressions that contain the do operator into expressions that do not. Expressions that do not include the do operator can be estimated from observational data alone, without the need for an experimental intervention, which might be expensive, lengthy or even unethical (e.g., asking subjects to take up smoking). The set of rules is complete (it can be used to derive every true statement in this system). An algorithm can determine whether, for a given model, a solution is computable in polynomial time.

==== Rules ====
The calculus includes three rules for the transformation of conditional probability expressions involving the do operator.

===== Rule 1 =====
Rule 1 permits the addition or deletion of observations:

$$P(Y|do(X), Z, W) = P(Y|do(X),Z)$$

in the case that the variable set Z blocks all paths from W to Y and all arrows leading into X have been deleted.

===== Rule 2 =====
Rule 2 permits the replacement of an intervention with an observation or vice versa:

$$P(Y|do(X),Z) = P(Y|X,Z)$$

in the case that Z satisfies the back-door criterion.

===== Rule 3 =====
Rule 3 permits the deletion or addition of interventions:

$$P(Y|do(X)) = P(Y)$$

in the case where no causal paths connect X and Y.

==== Extensions ====
The rules do not imply that any query can have its do operators removed. In those cases, it may be possible to substitute a variable that is subject to manipulation (e.g., diet) in place of one that is not (e.g., blood cholesterol), which can then be transformed to remove the do. Example:

$$P(\text{Heart disease} |do(\text{blood cholesterol})) = P(\text{Heart disease}|do(\text{diet}))$$

== Counterfactuals ==
Counterfactuals consider possibilities that are not found in data, such as whether a nonsmoker would have developed cancer had they instead been a heavy smoker. They are the highest step on Pearl's causality ladder.

=== Potential outcome ===
Definition: A potential outcome for a variable Y is "the value Y would have taken for individual u, had X been assigned the value x". Mathematically:

$Y_{X = x}(u)$ or $Y_x(u)$.

The potential outcome is defined at the level of the individual u.

The conventional approach to potential outcomes is data-, not model-driven, limiting its ability to untangle causal relationships. It treats causal questions as problems of missing data and gives incorrect answers to even standard scenarios.

=== Causal inference ===
In the context of causal models, potential outcomes are interpreted causally, rather than statistically.

The first law of causal inference states that the potential outcome

$$Y_X(u)$$

can be computed by modifying causal model M (by deleting arrows into X) and computing the outcome for some x. Formally:

$$Y_X(u) = Y_{Mx}(u)$$

=== Conducting a counterfactual ===
Examining a counterfactual using a causal model involves three steps. The approach is valid regardless of the form of the model relationships, linear or otherwise. When the model relationships are fully specified, point values can be computed. In other cases (e.g., when only probabilities are available) a probability-interval statement, such as non-smoker x would have a 10-20% chance of cancer, can be computed.

Given the model:

$$Y \leftarrow X \rightarrow M \rightarrow Y \leftarrow U$$

the equations for calculating the values of A and C derived from regression analysis or another technique can be applied, substituting known values from an observation and fixing the value of other variables (the counterfactual).

==== Abduct ====
Apply abductive reasoning (logical inference that uses observation to find the simplest/most likely explanation) to estimate u, the proxy for the unobserved variables on the specific observation that supports the counterfactual. Compute the probability of u given the propositional evidence.

==== Act ====
For a specific observation, use the do operator to establish the counterfactual (e.g., m=0), modifying the equations accordingly.

==== Predict ====
Calculate the values of the output (y) using the modified equations.

=== Mediation ===
Direct and indirect (mediated) causes can only be distinguished via conducting counterfactuals. Understanding mediation requires holding the mediator constant while intervening on the direct cause. In the model

$Y \leftarrow M \leftarrow X \rightarrow Y$

M mediates X's influence on Y, while X also has an unmediated effect on Y. Thus M is held constant, while do(X) is computed.

The Mediation Fallacy instead involves conditioning on the mediator if the mediator and the outcome are confounded, as they are in the above model.

For linear models, the indirect effect can be computed by taking the product of all the path coefficients along a mediated pathway. The total indirect effect is computed by the sum of the individual indirect effects. For linear models mediation is indicated when the coefficients of an equation fitted without including the mediator vary significantly from an equation that includes it.

==== Direct effect ====
In experiments on such a model, the controlled direct effect (CDE) is computed by forcing the value of the mediator M (do(M = 0)) and randomly assigning some subjects to each of the values of X (do(X=0), do(X=1), ...) and observing the resulting values of Y.

$$CDE(0) = P(Y=1|do(X=1), do(M=0)) - P(Y=1|do(X=0), do(M=0))$$

Each value of the mediator has a corresponding CDE.

However, a better experiment is to compute the natural direct effect. (NDE) This is the effect determined by leaving the relationship between X and M untouched while intervening on the relationship between X and Y.

$$NDE = P(Y_{M=M0}=1|do(X=1)) - P(Y_{M=M0}=1|do(X=0))$$

For example, consider the direct effect of increasing dental hygienist visits (X) from every other year to every year, which encourages flossing (M). Gums (Y) get healthier, either because of the hygienist (direct) or the flossing (mediator/indirect). The experiment is to continue flossing while skipping the hygienist visit.

==== Indirect effect ====
The indirect effect of X on Y is the "increase we would see in Y while holding X constant and increasing M to whatever value M would attain under a unit increase in X".

Indirect effects cannot be "controlled" because the direct path cannot be disabled by holding another variable constant. The natural indirect effect (NIE) is the effect on gum health (Y) from flossing (M). The NIE is calculated as the sum of (floss and no-floss cases) of the difference between the probability of flossing given the hygienist and without the hygienist, or:

$$NIE = \sum_m[P(M=m|X=1)-P(M=m|X=0)] x x P(Y=1|X=0,M=m)$$

The above NDE calculation includes counterfactual subscripts ($Y_{M=M0}$). For nonlinear models, the seemingly obvious equivalence

$$\mathsf{Total \ effect = Direct \ effect + Indirect \ effect}$$

does not apply because of anomalies such as threshold effects and binary values. However,

$$\mathsf{Total \ effect}(X=0 \rightarrow X = 1) = NDE(X=0 \rightarrow X = 1) - \ NIE(X=1 \rightarrow X=0)$$

works for all model relationships (linear and nonlinear). It allows NDE to then be calculated directly from observational data, without interventions or use of counterfactual subscripts.

== Transportability ==
Causal models provide a vehicle for integrating data across datasets, known as transport, even though the causal models (and the associated data) differ. For example, survey data can be merged with randomized, controlled trial data. Transport offers a solution to the question of external validity, whether a study can be applied in a different context.

Where two models match on all relevant variables and data from one model is known to be unbiased, data from one population can be used to draw conclusions about the other. In other cases, where data is known to be biased, reweighting can allow the dataset to be transported. In a third case, conclusions can be drawn from an incomplete dataset. In some cases, data from studies of multiple populations can be combined (via transportation) to allow conclusions about an unmeasured population. In some cases, combining estimates (e.g., P(W|X)) from multiple studies can increase the precision of a conclusion.

Do-calculus provides a general criterion for transport: A target variable can be transformed into another expression via a series of do-operations that does not involve any "difference-producing" variables (those that distinguish the two populations). An analogous rule applies to studies that have relevantly different participants.

== Bayesian network ==
Any causal model can be implemented as a Bayesian network. Bayesian networks can be used to provide the inverse probability of an event (given an outcome, what are the probabilities of a specific cause). This requires preparation of a conditional probability table, showing all possible inputs and outcomes with their associated probabilities.

For example, given a two variable model of Disease and Test (for the disease) the conditional probability table takes the form:

Probability of a positive test for a given disease
	Test	
Disease	Positive	Negative
Negative	12	88
Positive	73	27

According to this table, when a patient does not have the disease, the probability of a positive test is 12%.

While this is tractable for small problems, as the number of variables and their associated states increase, the probability table (and associated computation time) increases exponentially.

Bayesian networks are used commercially in applications such as wireless data error correction and DNA analysis.

== Invariants/context ==
A different conceptualization of causality involves the notion of invariant relationships. In the case of identifying handwritten digits, digit shape controls meaning, thus shape and meaning are the invariants. Changing the shape changes the meaning. Other properties do not (e.g., color). This invariance should carry across datasets generated in different contexts (the non-invariant properties form the context). Rather than learning (assessing causality) using pooled data sets, learning on one and testing on another can help distinguish variant from invariant properties.

== See also ==
- Causal system
- Causal network – a Bayesian network with an explicit requirement that the relationships be causal
- Structural equation modeling – a statistical technique for testing and estimating causal relations
- Path analysis (statistics)
- Bayesian network
- Causal map
- Dynamic causal modeling
- Rubin causal model

== Sources ==
- Pearl, Judea (2009-09-14). Causality. Cambridge University Press. ISBN 978-1-139-64398-6.
- Dawid, A. Philip. "Beware of the DAG!." Causality: objectives and assessment. PMLR, 2010. https://proceedings.mlr.press/v6/dawid10a/dawid10a.pdf
