= IWPR =

IWPR may refer to:

- Institute for War and Peace Reporting, an independent not-for-profit organisation
- Institute for Women's Policy Research, an organization founded in 1987 to meet the need for women-centered, policy-oriented research
