= C. Nicole Mason =

American author and researcher

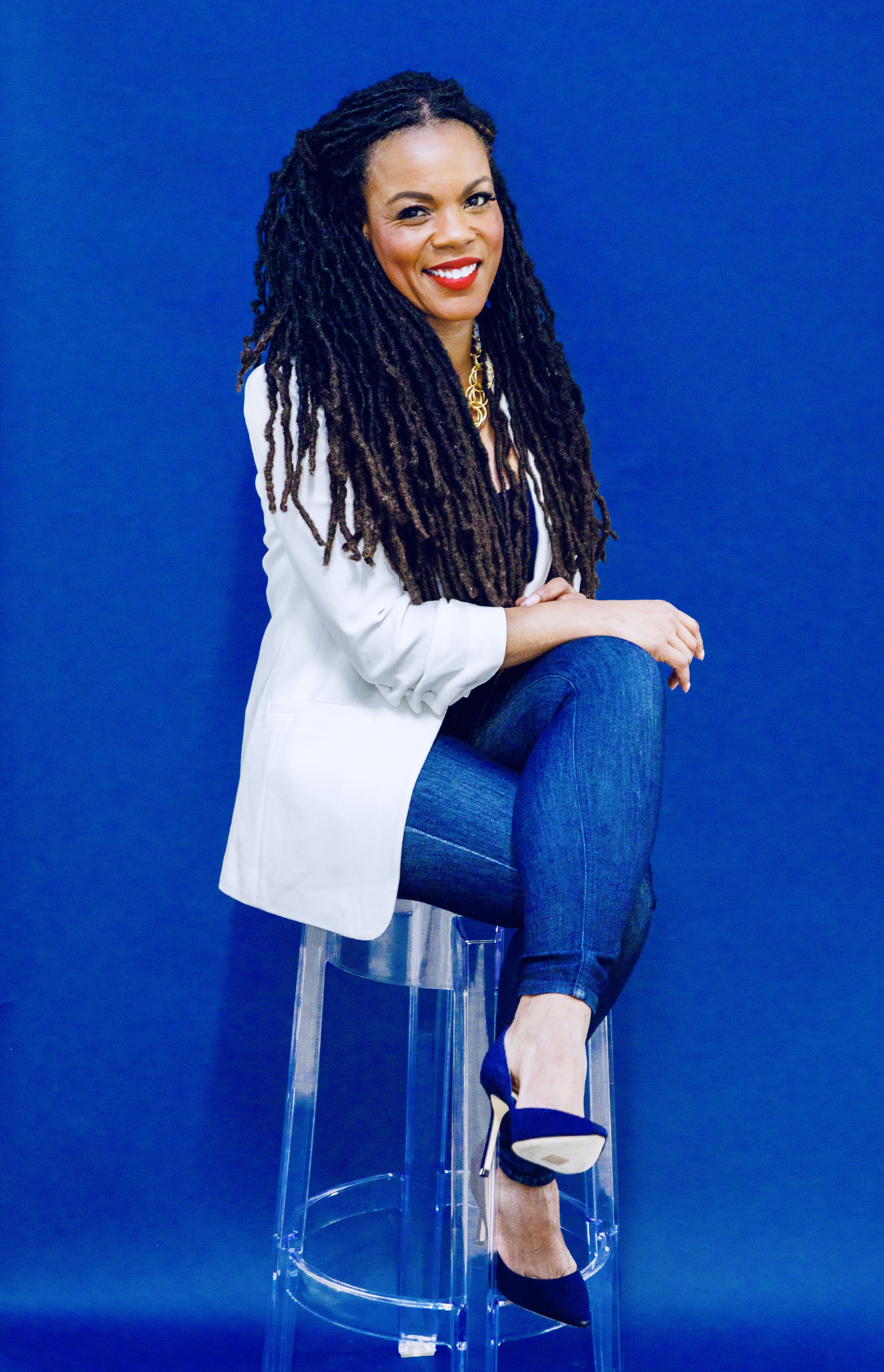
- Born: 1976 (age 49–50); Los Angeles, California
- Education: Howard University (BA); University of Maryland, College Park (MA, PhD)
- Occupations: Author, researcher
- Employer: Future Forward Women at the New York Women's Foundation
- Known for: Intersectional Research and Public Policy Analysis, Poverty Alleviation, Feminist Activism
- Honours: Named as Fortune's World's 50 Greatest Leaders

C. Nicole Mason (born 1976, Los Angeles, California) is an American author, columnist and researcher. She is the founder and CEO of Future Forward Women and the former president and CEO of the Institute for Women's Policy Research.

== Early life and education ==
Mason was born in Los Angeles, California. She was raised by a single mother.

She earned a master's degree and PhD in government and politics from the University of Maryland, College Park, specializing in women, public policy, and political philosophy. She was the first Black woman in the program to specialize in political philosophy. Political scientist Linda Faye Williams served as her dissertation chair. She also completed a women's studies certificate under Bonnie Thornton Dill and Seung-kyung Kim.

== Research ==
Mason's research examines how race, class, and gender intersect to influence public policy. At the start of the COVID-19 pandemic, she coined the term "she-cession" to describe the disproportionate loss of employment and income experienced by women.

== Personal life ==
Mason resides between New York and Maryland and has two children.

== Awards and honors ==
- "World's 50 Greatest Leaders", Fortune magazine, 2021
- 100 Influential Women Leaders, Glamour magazine
- Thrive Leader, Kresge Foundation
- New Executive Leadership fund, Open Society Foundations, 2021

== Bibliography ==
- Nicole Mason, C. (2013). Me First: A Deliciously Selfish Take on Life. Macmillan. ISBN 9781250069924.
- Nicole Mason, C. (2018). Born Bright: A Young Girl's Journey from Nothing to Something in America. Mason-Charbonnet Holdings, LLC. ISBN 9780615808741.
