= Rudolf Winter-Ebmer =

Austrian economist (born 1961)

- Born: August 25, 1961 (age 65); Steyr, Austria
- Citizenship: Austrian
- Spouse(s): Yes; 2 children

Academic background
- Education: Johannes Kepler University Linz (PhD, 1991; Habilitation, 1996)

Academic work
- Discipline: Labor economics
- Institutions: Johannes Kepler University Linz
- Awards: 2013 Landeskulturpreis für Wissenschaft OÖ
- Website: Information at IDEAS / RePEc

Rudolf Winter-Ebmer (born 1961 in Steyr, Austria) is an Austrian economist and professor of labor economics at Johannes Kepler University Linz, where he is also chair of the department of economics. He is also a senior fellow at the Institute for Advanced Studies in Vienna, Austria. Since 2011, he has also been associate editor of the Institute's official journal, Empirical Economics. He has been heading a Christian-Doppler Laboratory of "Ageing, Health and the Labor Market" at the Johannes-Kepler-University of Linz 2014-2021. He is a member of the German Academy of Sciences (Leopoldina) and a former President of the European Society for Population Economics. 2021-22, he was President of the Austrian Economic Association (NOEG).

Rudolf Winter-Ebmer initiated the Austrian part of the SHARE survey (Survey on Health, Ageing and Retirement in Europe) in 2001 - the largest socio-economic project in the European Union and co-initiated the Austrian Socio-Economic Panel (ASEP), 2023.

His research concentrates on empirical labor economics, wage determination, migration, ageing, gender economics, unemployment and the analysis of price comparison sites.
