= Institute for Women's Policy Research =

American non-profit organization

- Formation: 1987
- Founder: Heidi Hartmann
- Legal status: Non-profit research organization
- Purpose: To conduct rigorous research and disseminate the findings to address the needs of women, promote public dialog, and strengthen families, communities, and societies.
- Headquarters: The George Washington University
- Location: United States
- President: C. Nicole Mason
- Vice president: Cynthia Hess
- Revenue: $4,244,616 (2021)
- Expenses: $4,167,852 (2021)
- Website: www.iwpr.org

The Institute for Women's Policy Research (IWPR) is a non-profit research organization based in Washington, D.C. Founded in 1987 by Heidi Hartmann, IWPR works to increase public understanding of how social and government policies impede gender equality. The non-profit publishes policy research relating to gender gaps in education, work, poverty, health, and other topical areas.

== History ==
IWPR was founded in 1987 by feminist and MacArthur Fellowship Award recipient Heidi Hartmann. IWPR was the first think-tank to focus on quantitative research into women's policy. Since 1996, the organization has published The Status of Women in the States every two years.

== Research areas and findings ==
IWPR publishes reports, fact sheets, and briefing papers with women as the central point of analysis, using federal and state data sources. These documents focus on gender equality and its effects on social mobility, income security, education, employment, and social issues.

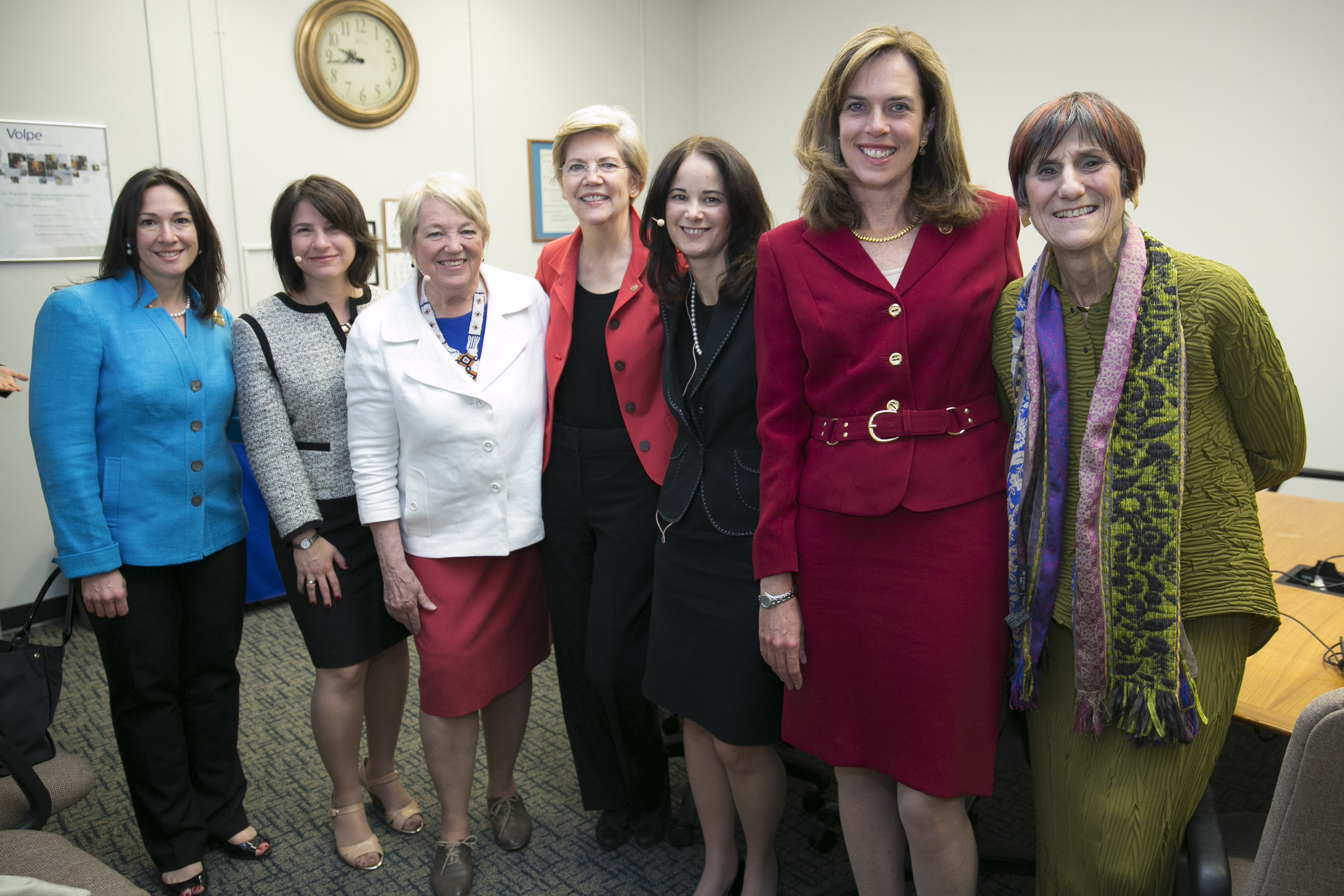
Heidi Hartmann (3rd from the left) at the Department of Labor Regional Forum on Working Families Boston

=== Pay equity ===
Focusing on pay inequity is a major IWPR effort. They publish reports that demonstrate that women earn less than men in nearly every profession, even in fields dominated by women such as teaching. IWPR identified that prohibitions on discussing pay with co-workers contribute to the gender pay gap.

=== Poverty and health outcomes ===
IWPR has conducted research concerning gender inequities and their impact on economic security and health outcomes since 2016, determining that women are more likely to encounter poverty and to experience more severe poverty than men.

=== Workforce participation ===
A 2019 IWPR released a report on a study funded by the March of Dimes Center for Social Science Research. The study, which investigated factors related to women's workforce participation after having a child, found that nearly 30% of women leave their jobs in the year following childbirth or adoption, with 20% of women not returning to work within ten years. The study demonstrated that paid family leave reduced women's attrition from the labor market by 20%. IWPR has also investigated gender inequity in United States Patents for inventions, finding that only 7.7% of patents filed between 1977 and 2010 list a woman as the primary investigator.

=== Social status ===
IWPR first published social indicators for women's fiscal, political, and reproductive autonomy in 1996, which are used as indices for the Status of Women in the States reports. These IWPR indicators have been used by other researchers to look for correlations between women's status and other characteristics such as women's health outcomes. New indicators were issued by IWPR in 2020 to measure equality in dimensions of work and family. These include paid leave, childcare, and the labor force participation of parents.

=== Political participation ===
One of the social indicator domains developed by the IWPR is political participation, for which they developed the political participation composite index. The index measures women's representation in elected office (at the state and national levels), voter registration, and voter turnout. Each of these aspects includes several component indicators with weighted points depending on the level of participation or influence (for example, state legislators are given less weight than US representatives). Markers related to institutional resources are also included in the political participation index. An example of an institutional resource metric is the number of women seated on legislative caucuses.

=== Parenting students and higher education ===
In 2018, IWPR partnered with non-profit organizations Generation Hope, Chegg.org, and the Hope Center for College, Community, and Justice to conduct a national survey of student parents at 147 U.S. colleges and universities. The survey found that 20% of all parenting students enrolled in higher education felt unwelcome on campus, with higher percentages for Black and Hispanic/Latino students. The report identified institutional policies, student services, and campus characteristics that contribute to this sense of isolation.
