= Argument technology =

Sub-field of artificial intelligence

Argument technology is a sub-field of collective intelligence and artificial intelligence that focuses on applying computational techniques to the creation, identification, analysis, navigation, evaluation and visualisation of arguments and debates.

In the 1980s and 1990s, philosophical theories of arguments in general, and argumentation theory in particular, were leveraged to handle key computational challenges, such as modeling non-monotonic and defeasible reasoning and designing robust coordination protocols for multi-agent systems. At the same time, mechanisms for computing semantics of Argumentation frameworks were introduced as a way of providing a calculus of opposition for computing what it is reasonable to believe in the context of conflicting arguments.

With these foundations in place, the area was kick-started by a workshop held in the Scottish Highlands in 2000, the result of which was a book coauthored by philosophers of argument, rhetoricians, legal scholars and AI researchers. Since then, the area has been supported by various dedicated events such as the International Workshop on Computational Models of Natural Argument (CMNA) which has run annually since 2001; the International Workshop on Argument in Multi Agent Systems (ArgMAS) annually since 2004; the Workshop on Argument Mining, annually since 2014, and the Conference on Computational Models of Argument (COMMA), biennially since 2006. Since 2010, the field has also had its own journal, Argument & Computation, which was published by Taylor & Francis until 2016 and since then by IOS Press.

One of the challenges that argument technology faced was a lack of standardisation in the representation and underlying conception of argument in machine readable terms. Many different software tools for manual argument analysis, in particular, developed idiosyncratic and ad hoc ways of representing arguments which reflected differing underlying ways of conceiving of argumentative structure. This lack of standardisation also meant that there was no interchange between tools or between research projects, and little re-use of data resources that were often expensive to create. To tackle this problem, the Argument Interchange Format set out to establish a common standard that captured the minimal common features of argumentation which could then be extended in different settings.

Since about 2018, argument technology has been growing rapidly, with, for example, IBM's Grand Challenge, Project Debater, results for which were published in Nature in March 2021; German research funder, DFG's nationwide research programme on Robust Argumentation Machines, RATIO, begun in 2019; and UK nationwide deployment of The Evidence Toolkit by the BBC in 2019. A 2021 video narrated by Stephen Fry provides a summary of the societal motivations for work in argument technology.

Argument technology has applications in a variety of domains, including education, healthcare, policy making, political science, intelligence analysis and risk management and has a variety of sub-fields, methodologies and technologies.

== Technologies ==
=== Argument assistant ===
An argument assistant is a software tool which support users when writing arguments. Argument assistants can help users compose content, review content from one other, including in dialogical contexts. In addition to Web services, such functionalities can be provided through the plugin architectures of word processor software or those of Web browsers. Internet forums, for instance, can be greatly enhanced by such software tools and services.

=== Argument blogging ===
ArguBlogging is software which allows its users to select portions of hypertext on webpages in their Web browsers and to agree or disagree with the selected content, posting their arguments to their blogs with linked argument data. It is implemented as a bookmarklet, adding functionality to Web browsers and interoperating with blogging platforms such as Blogger and Tumblr.

=== Argument mapping ===
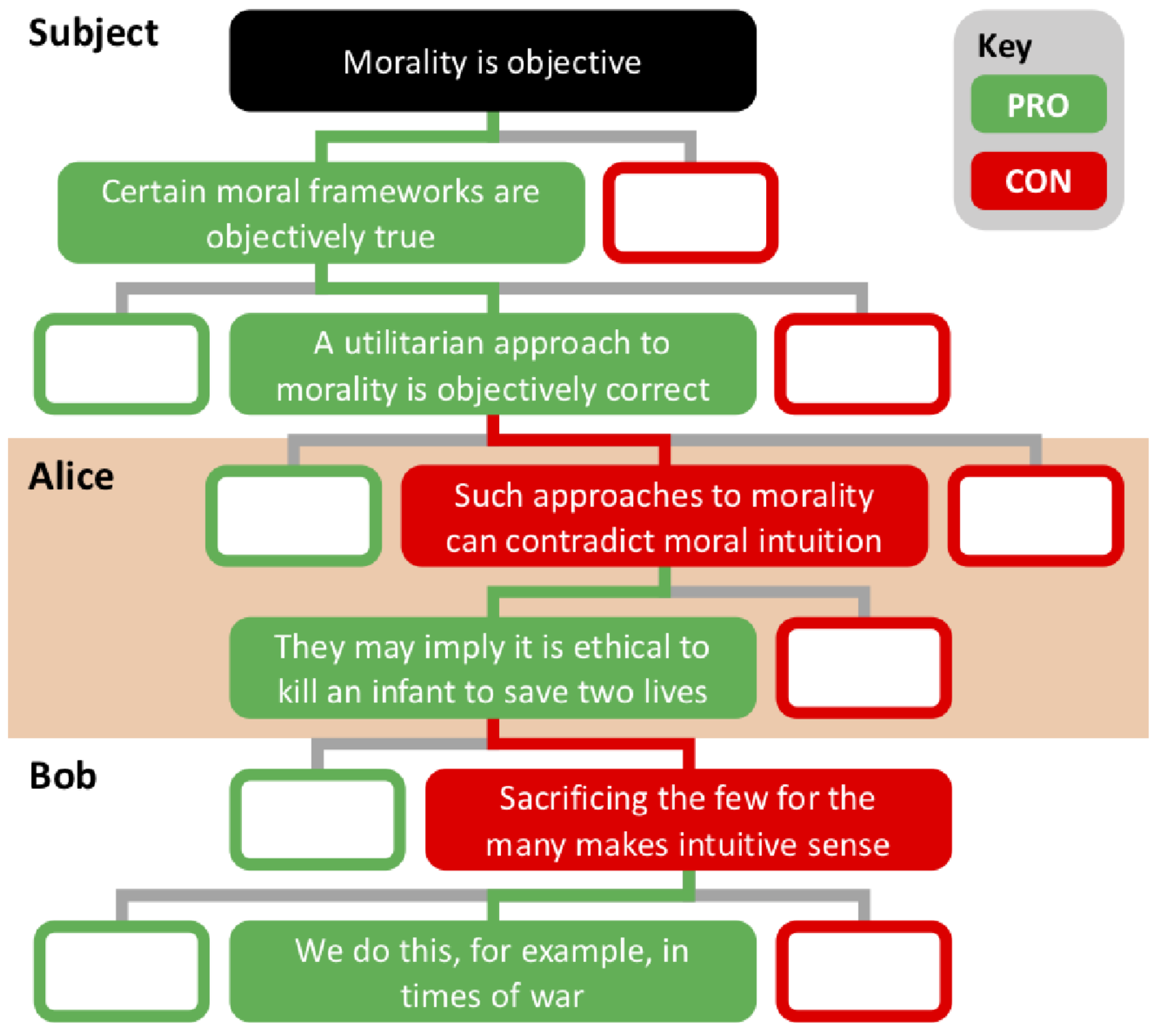
Kialo debate tree schema with an example path through it: all Con-argument boxes and some Pros were emptied to illustrate an example path.

Argument maps are visual, diagrammatic representations of arguments. Such visual diagrams facilitate diagrammatic reasoning and promote one's ability to grasp and to make sense of information rapidly and readily. Argument maps can provide structured, semi-formal frameworks for representing arguments using interactive visual language. One avenue of research and development is the design of online platforms to leverage collective intelligence to populate such maps and to integrate data, optimize and assess arguments.

=== Argument mining ===
Argument mining, or argumentation mining, is a research area within the natural language processing field. The goal of argument mining is the automatic extraction and identification of argumentative structures from natural language text with the aid of computer programs.

=== Argument search ===
An argument search engine is a search engine that is given a topic as a user query and returns a list of arguments for and against the topic or about that topic. Such engines could be used to support informed decision-making or to help debaters prepare for debates.

=== Automated argumentative essay scoring ===
The goal of automated argumentative essay scoring systems is to assist students in improving their writing skills by measuring the quality of their argumentative content.

=== Debate technology ===
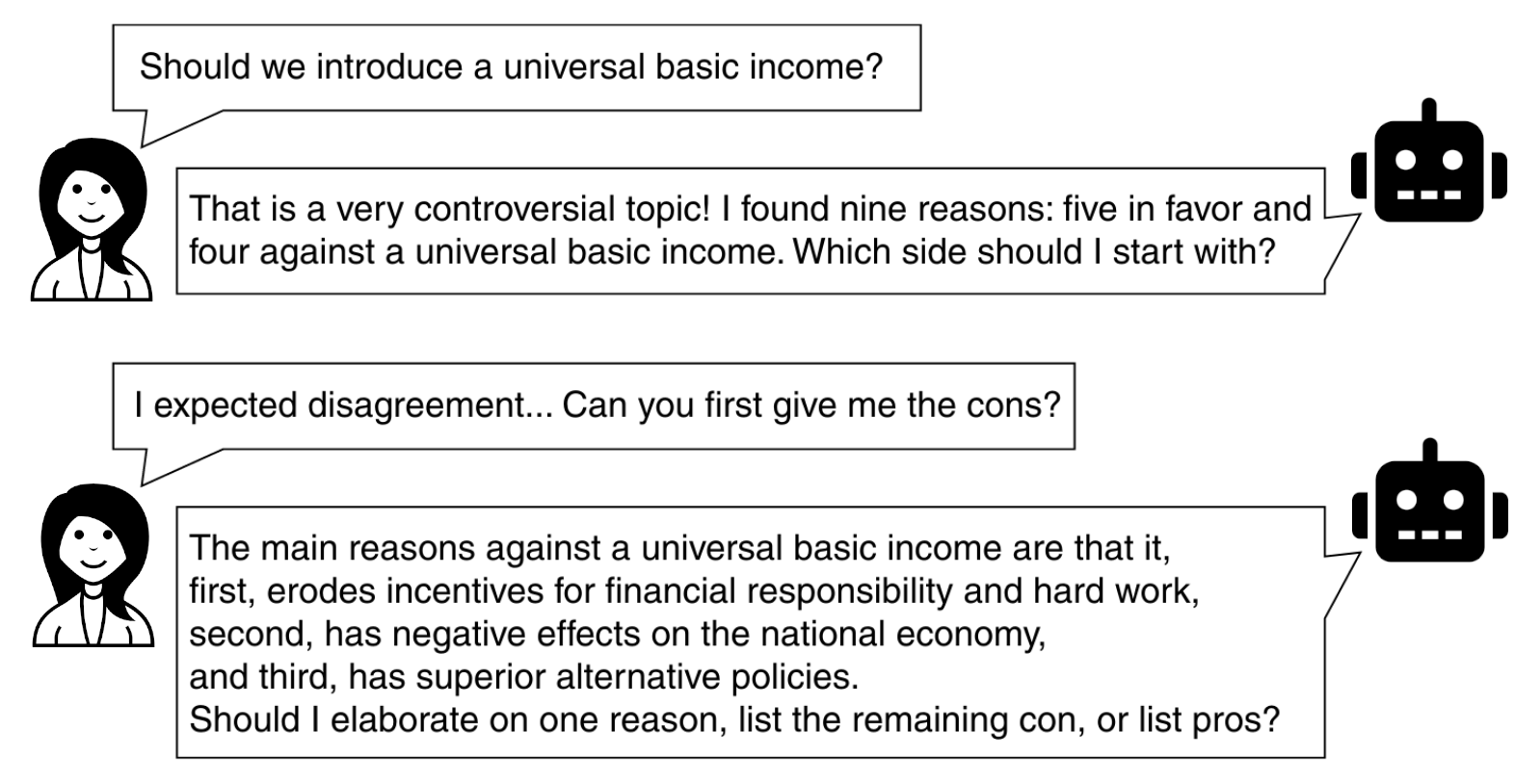
Structured debates from platforms like Kialo could be used for "artificial deliberative agents" (ADAs) or computational reasoning.

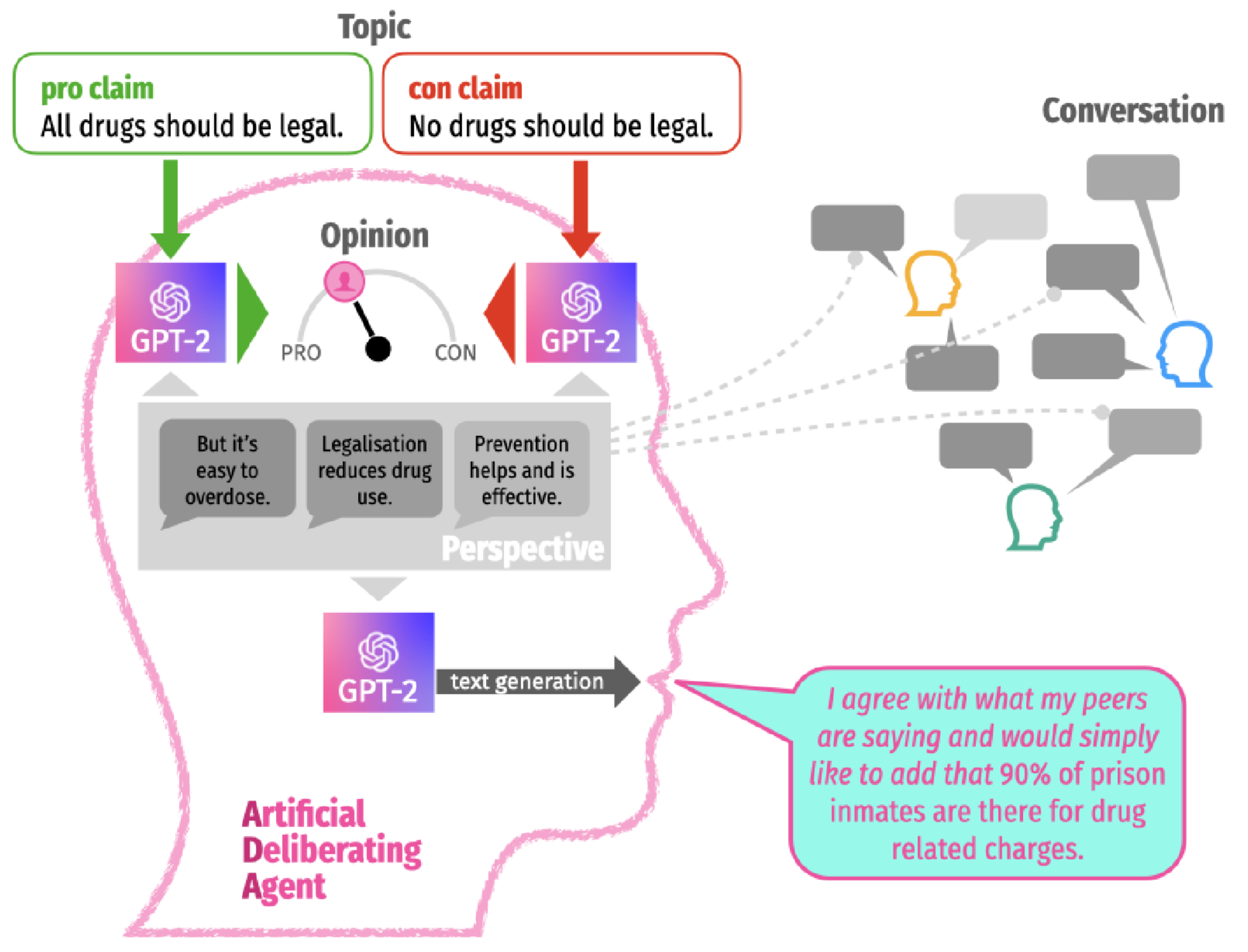
Example of an ADA contributing missing information to a debate via crawled Kialo data and selected based on the prior conversation and crawled argument weight ratings.

Debate technology focuses on human-machine interaction and in particular providing systems that support, monitor and engage in debate. One of the most high-profile examples of debating technology is IBM's Project Debater which combines scripted communication with very large-scale processing of news articles to identify and construct arguments on the fly in a competitive debating setting. Debating technology also encompasses tools aimed at providing insight into debates, typically using techniques from data science. These analytics have been developed in both academic and commercial settings.

=== Decision support system ===
Argument technology can reduce both individual and group biases and facilitate more accurate decisions. Argument-based decision support systems do so by helping users to distinguish between claims and the evidence supporting them, and express their confidence in and evaluate the strength of evidence of competing claims. They have been used to improve predictions of housing market trends, risk analysis, ethical and legal decision making.

==== Ethical decision support system ====
An ethical decision support system is a decision support system which supports users in moral reasoning and decision-making.

==== Legal decision support system ====
A legal decision support system is a decision support system which supports users in legal reasoning and decision-making.

=== Explainable artificial intelligence ===
An explainable or transparent artificial intelligence system is an artificial intelligence system whose actions can be easily understood by humans.

=== Intelligent tutoring system ===
An intelligent tutoring system is a computer system that aims to provide immediate and customized instruction or feedback to learners, usually without requiring intervention from a human teacher. The intersection of argument technology and intelligent tutoring systems includes computer systems which aim to provide instruction in: critical thinking, argumentation, ethics, law, mathematics, and philosophy.

=== Legal expert system ===
A legal expert system is a domain-specific expert system that uses artificial intelligence to emulate the decision-making abilities of a human expert in the field of law.

=== Machine ethics ===
Machine ethics is a part of the ethics of artificial intelligence concerned with the moral behavior of artificially intelligent beings. As humans argue with respect to morality and moral behavior, argument can be envisioned as a component of machine ethics systems and moral reasoning components.

=== Proof assistant ===
In computer science and mathematical logic, a proof assistant or interactive theorem prover is a software tool to assist with the development of formal proofs by human-machine collaboration. This involves some sort of interactive proof editor, or other interface, with which a human can guide the search for proofs, the details of which are stored in, and some steps provided by, a computer.

=== Ethical considerations ===
Ethical considerations of argument technology include privacy, transparency, societal concerns, and diversity in representation. These factors cut across different levels such as technology, user interface design, user, service context, and society. There is concern about unethical misuse for "generating arguments on controversial topics with specific stances and deploying them on social platforms". Another issue may concern the design of conclusion-making algorithms, such as e.g. enabling such to conclude that certain key data is needed instead of only making lists of best-fit conclusions or enabling the generation of multiple conclusions from the same data based on different argument-assessments or assessment methods.
