= Argument Web =

The Argument Web is a large-scale Web of interconnected arguments created by individuals as they express their opinions and interact with the opinions of others. The Argument Web aims to make online debate intuitive for participants such as mediators, students, academics, broadcasters and bloggers, to create a Web infrastructure that allows for the storage, automatic retrieval and analysis of linked argument data, and to improve the quality of online argument and debate. The Argument Web can be described as a portion of a larger Semantic Web.

== AIFdb ==
AIFdb
- Website type: Research
- Website: http://www.aifdb.org/
- Commercial: No
- Registration: None

AIFdb is a database implementation or ‘reification’ of the Argument Interchange Format (AIF), which allows for the storage and retrieval of AIF compliant argument structures. This database solution was provided as a foundation for an open, integrated Argument Web. It offers an extensive range of web services for interacting with stored argument data, while also offering search and argument visualisation features that are all consistent with the formal ontology of AIF.

At a basic level, the AIFdb web services allow for the insertion and querying of basic components of an AIF argument, such as nodes, edges and schemes. Building upon this basis, it also facilitates more complex interactions with these AIF argument structures. Such complex queries could make it possible, for example, to determine all the statements made by a particular person in support a given I-Node. While, at its highest level of interaction, AIFdb can handle the import and export of many standard file formats, including SVG, DOT, RDF/XML and other formats of argument theory tools, like Carneades, Rationale and Araucaria.

== Argument blogging ==
ArguBlogging is software which allows its users to select portions of hypertext on webpages in their Web browsers and to agree or disagree with the selected content, posting their arguments to their blogs with linked argument data. It is implemented as a bookmarklet, adding functionality to Web browsers and interoperating with blogging platforms such as Blogger and Tumblr.

== See also ==
- Argument Interchange Format
