= AIF =

AIF, A.I.F., AiF or aif may refer to:

== Arts, entertainment and media ==
- Argumenty i Fakty (AiF), a Russian newspaper
- Australians in Film (AiF), a Los Angeles-based organisation for the promotion of Australian actors and filmmakers
- Aspen Ideas Festival, an annual event in U.S.

== Business and organizations ==
- American India Foundation, a nonprofit American organization
- The American Ireland Fund, an American charity
- Amsterdam Institute of Finance, a Dutch financial training institute
- Anti-Fascist Internationalist Front, an armed internationalist group in Myanmar
- Asian Institute of Finance, a nonprofit Malaysian financial organization
- Association internationale des femmes, a former feminist organization
- Atlantic Innovation Fund, a funding program of the Atlantic Canada Opportunities Agency
- Atomic Industrial Forum, a former industrial policy organization
- Australians in Film (AiF), a Los Angeles-based organisation for the promotion of Australian actors and filmmakers
- Financial Information Authority (Vatican City), (Autorità di Informazione Finanziaria)

== Military ==
- First Australian Imperial Force, an expeditionary force during World War I
- Second Australian Imperial Force, an expeditionary force during World War II

== Science and technology ==
- Apoptosis-inducing factor, a flavoprotein
- Arm Image Format, an object code format in computer programming
- .aif, the Audio Interchange File Format
- Author Impact Factor, an author-level metric

== Sports ==
- American Indoor Football, a professional indoor football league
- Arbeidernes Idrettsforbund ("Workers' Federation of Sports"), a former Norwegian sporting organization
- Several Swedish sports clubs have AIF in the title; see

== Other uses ==
- Alternative investment fund
- Argument Interchange Format, a means of exchanging argument resources between research groups

== See also ==
- ÅIF (disambiguation)
