= Argüman =

Argument analysis and mapping software

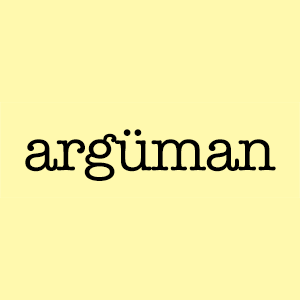

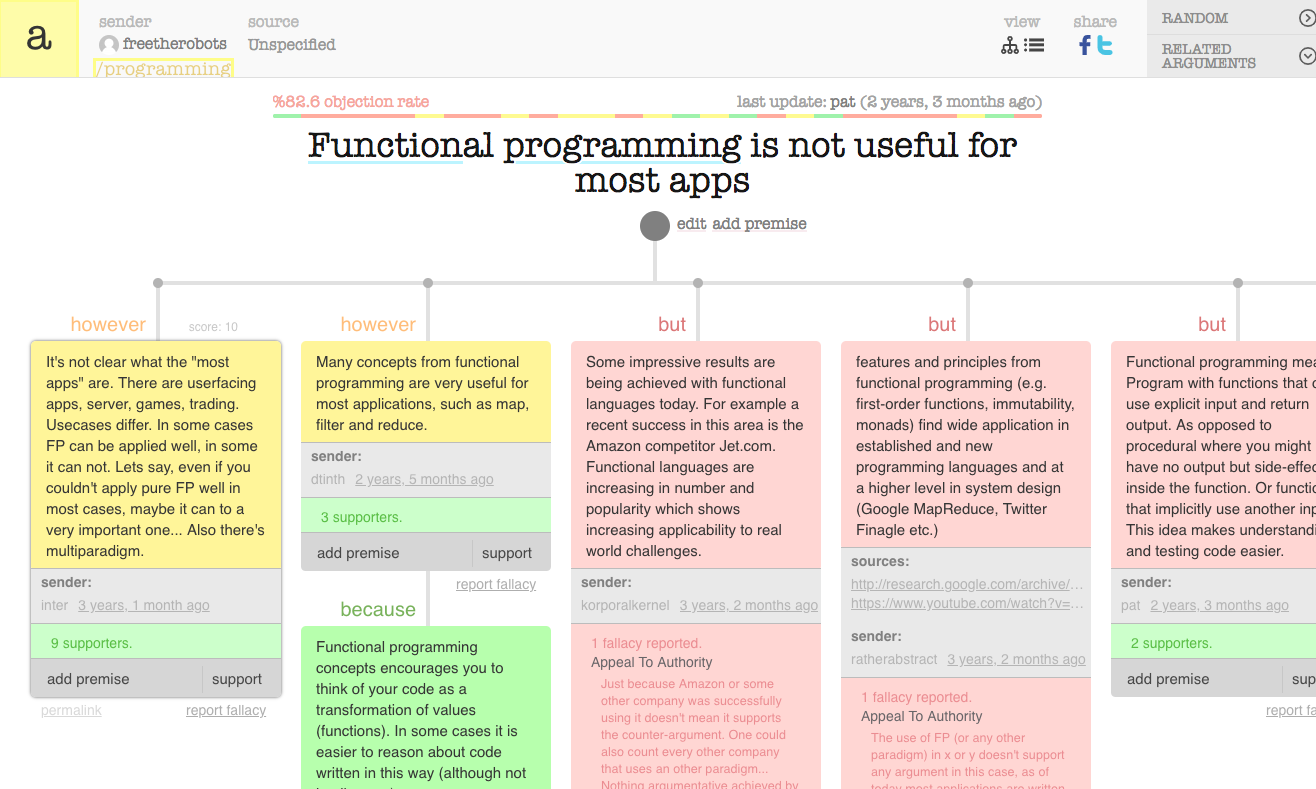
- Example Argüman argument map
- Repository: github.com/arguman/arguman.org
- Written in: Python / Django
- License: GNU Affero General Public License
- Website: arguman.org

Argüman is a free and open source software for collective structured argumentation and argument analysis via argumentation graphs or argument maps in which the type of connections can be specified. It allows users to create collaborative "semantic maps" of arguments in well structured tree formats and share them with an audience and potential participants. Arguman.org was an open structured social debate platform that implemented the software. It is down as of 2023. There also is a mobile version of the tool. The project was started, in 2014, and largely built by developers in Turkey.

Gource visualization video of the development of Argüman.

Some studies used or investigated excerpts of argumentations on the platform. Unlike the larger and functional alternative Kialo, which is structured using only 'Pro' and 'Con' relations, argüman arguments are structured by three types of premises – 'because', 'but', and 'however'. As of the latest version, debates are presented in their entirety as a large tree which may be harder to navigate than other formats – for instance, trees "can become extremely dense, and the interface does not make it obvious which arguments the user should pay attention to". Users can also flag arguments for fallacies. Arguman.org also had a Turkish-language subdomain.

A researcher suggested the concept of the Semantic Web-interoperability could be useful for argumentative structures on the Web, going beyond the conventional flat structures of discussions and lack of characterizations of their components as implemented in argüman. There is research into how to automatically use these collaborative argumentation graphs, which is a "very active" topic in Artificial Intelligence. There also is research into applying conclusion-making methods to the debates or their data, such as bipolar weighted argumentation frameworks – this could be a way to find out what the current conclusion of debates like "Computer Science is not actually a science" is. A study suggests it could be useful for the development of critical thinking skills.

== See also ==
- Argumentation theory
