= CMV =

CMV may refer to:

== Technology ==
- Chevrolet CMV, a van
- Continuous mandatory ventilation
- Coromandel Aerodrome, IATA airport designator
- Cruise & Maritime Voyages, a defunct UK-based cruise line
- Grizzly Combat Mobility Vehicle
- Columbia Music Video, a home video distributor

== Viruses ==
- Cucumber mosaic virus, of the family Bromoviridae
- Cytomegalovirus, a genus in the family Herpesviridae
  - Human cytomegalovirus, a human-infecting species of cytomegalovirus commonly known as CMV

== Other ==
- Commercial Motor Vehicle
- 905 in Roman numerals
- r/changemyview, a subreddit
