= ÅIF =

ÅIF may refer to:

- Åndalsnes IF
- Åssiden IF

== See also ==
- AIF (disambiguation)
