= Semantic architecture =

Concept in software architecture

Semantic architecture is a concept in software architecture. It proposes the creation of more useful architecture descriptions which can unambiguously capture, catalog, communicate, preserve, and can interoperably exchange semantics between different architectures.

== Overview ==
The overall goals of the semantic architecture are

- to define a formal semantic way of representing architecture intended to be both human and machine readable
- to describe a system architecture at a high level of abstraction
- to support automatic generation of software architecture models
- to permit analysis of architectural quality attributes
- to provide a repository of patterns expressed utilizing the semantic web standards RDF/S and OWL

In order to achieve these goals, the software architecture community and industry need to define

- a common architecture description language
- an OWL ontology for architecture data models
- a set of tools for capturing, querying, and visualizing all aspects and view points of an architecture

The tooling or toolkits for semantic architecture should

- be suitable for communicating an architecture to all stakeholders
- supports architecture creation, refinement, evaluation, and validation of quality attributes
- provides a basis for further implementation
- allows the architecture community to exchange semantics of architecture styles and patterns in an interoperable fashion

== See also ==
- Software architecture
- Semantic Web
- Ontology-based data integration
- Semantic mapper
- Semantic translation
