= Arm Image Format =

- Developed by: Acorn Computers
- Type of format: Binary, executable

In computer programming, the Arm Image Format (AIF) is an object file format used primarily for software intended to run on ARM microprocessors. It was introduced by Acorn Computers for use with their Archimedes computer. It can optionally facilitate debugging, including under operating systems running on other processor architectures.

== Format ==
The file can be either executable or non-executable and is loaded at 0x8000 unless otherwise specified. Executable files can relocate themselves if necessary and non-executable files are prepared for execution by an image loader. An extended AIF is a type of non-executable which includes information to enable the placement of code and data within specific areas of memory.

The file includes a header and separate areas of read-only and read-write code/data. It can optionally include data for debugging and the code (with list) for self-relocation.

== AIF header ==
The header includes information about self-relocation, entry point, exit instruction, area sizes and locations, debug type, addressing mode and memory placement (in the case of the extended file).

An allocation was later made in the header to mark executables as being "StrongARM-ready", to address some backward compatibility issues.

== Debugging ==
The files can be run for debugging under MS-DOS and SunOS using the ARM Windowing Debugger.

== Other uses ==
Microsoft's MMLite modular system architecture supports the loading of various image formats, including AIF files. Porting of Wind River Systems' VxWorks operating system to the StrongARM EBSA-285 board involved using AIF files.
