= Argument Interchange Format =

The Argument Interchange Format (AIF) is an international effort to develop a representational mechanism for exchanging argument resources between research groups, tools, and domains using a semantically rich language. AIF traces its history back to a 2005 colloquium in Budapest. The result of the work in Budapest was first published as a draft description in 2006. Building on this foundation, further work then used the AIF to build foundations for the Argument Web.

AIF-RDF is the extended ontology represented in the Resource Description Framework Schema (RDFS) semantic language.

The Argument Interchange Format introduces a small set of ontological concepts that aim to capture a common understanding of argument -- one that works in multiple domains (both domains of argumentation and also domains of academic research), so that data can be shared and re-used across different projects in different areas. These ontological concepts are:

- Information (I-nodes)
- Applications of Rules of Inference (RA-nodes)
- Applications of Rules of Conflict (CA-nodes)
- Applications of Rules of Preference (PA-nodes)

extended by:

- Schematic Forms (F-nodes) that are instantiated by RA, CA and PA nodes

The AIF has reifications in a variety of development environments and implementation languages including

- MySQL database schema
- RDF
- Prolog
- JSON

as well as translations to visual languages such as DOT and SVG.

AIF data can be accessed online at AIFdb.

== See also ==
- Argument map
