= Argument mining =

Research area

Argument mining, or argumentation mining, is a research area within the natural language processing field. The goal of argument mining is the automatic extraction and identification of argumentative structures from natural language text with the aid of computer programs. Such argumentative structures include the premise, conclusions, the argument scheme and the relationship between the main and subsidiary argument, or the main and counter-argument within discourse. The Argument Mining workshop series is the main research forum for argument mining related research.

== Applications ==
Argument mining has been applied in many different genres including the qualitative assessment of social media content (e.g. Twitter, Facebook), where it provides a powerful tool for policy-makers and researchers in social and political sciences. Other domains include legal documents, product reviews, scientific articles, online debates, newspaper articles and dialogical domains. Transfer learning approaches have been successfully used to combine the different domains into a domain agnostic argumentation model.

Argument mining has been used to provide students individual writing support by accessing and visualizing the argumentation discourse in their texts. The application of argument mining in a user-centered learning tool helped students to improve their argumentation skills significantly compared to traditional argumentation learning applications.

== Challenges ==
Given the wide variety of text genres and the different research perspectives and approaches, it has been difficult to reach a common and objective evaluation scheme. Many annotated data sets have been proposed, with some gaining popularity, but a consensual data set is yet to be found. Annotating argumentative structures is a highly demanding task. There have been successful attempts to delegate such annotation tasks to the crowd but the process still requires a lot of effort and carries significant cost. Initial attempts to bypass this hurdle were made using the weak supervision approach.

== See also ==
- Argument technology – Sub-field of artificial intelligence
- Argumentation theory – Academic field of logic and rhetoric
- Logic translation – Translation of a text into a logical system
