= R/changemyview =

Subreddit dedicated to presenting opposing viewpoints

r/changemyview
- Website type: Subreddit
- Available in: English
- Founder: Kal Turnbull (u/Snorrrlax)
- Website: www.reddit.com/r/changemyview
- Commercial: Yes
- Users: 1.1 million weekly visitors (as of March 2026)
- Launched: January 16, 2013; 13 years ago

r/changemyview, also known as Change My View (CMV), is a community (subreddit) on the social media platform Reddit where participants discuss various topics for the purpose of understanding opposing viewpoints. Topics discussed include politics, media, and popular culture.

== Format ==
Users submit posts containing an opinion of theirs, and respondents to each post attempt to change the poster's views on that matter. Submitters must reply to these challenges in three hours or less, resulting in debate over the topic. If their view is changed, they can award a delta symbol (∆) to a commenter. Deltas are considered an honor, and are tracked in user flairs.

Rules for the community include that people should explain their reason, focus on the argument, and be civil.

== History ==
The forum was established by Kal Turnbull, a Scottish musician, in 2013; he was 17 years old at the time. He came up with the idea after noticing that everyone in his friend group all shared similar views, leading him to wonder how one could easily come across opposing viewpoints. Less than a year after its founding, the subreddit gained 100,000 members.

In 2019, Turnbull started his own site based on the concept, called ChangeAView.

=== University of Zurich AI experiment controversy ===
In April 2025, moderators of r/changemyview disclosed that researchers from the University of Zurich had conducted an unauthorised experiment on the subreddit using undisclosed AI-generated comments to test the persuasive power of large language models. In a public post, the moderators detailed that the researchers created multiple accounts and tailored responses to users based on inferred personal attributes, without prior consent or moderator approval, violating subreddit rules. The CMV mod team filed an ethics complaint with the University, requesting that the study not be published.

In their response, the University acknowledged concerns, issued a formal warning to the researchers, and committed to stricter future oversight, but stated that the findings warranted publication. The moderators criticised the study as unethical and harmful to the community, publishing a list of active AI accounts and locking their comment histories for transparency.

Following the disclosure, Reddit's Chief Legal Officer, Ben Lee (u/traceroo), publicly condemned the experiment as "deeply wrong on both a moral and legal level," stating it violated Reddit's terms of service, community rules, academic research standards, and human rights norms. Reddit banned all accounts associated with the study, committed to improving detection of inauthentic content, and initiated formal legal action against the researchers and the university.

== Reception ==
Conversations from the subreddit have been the subject of research on interaction dynamics.
