= Logic and dialectic =

Formalisation of dialectic

Formal scientists have attempted to combine formal logic (the science of deductively valid inferences or of logical truths) and dialectic (a form of reasoning based upon dialogue of arguments and counter-arguments) through formalisation of dialectic. These attempts include pre-formal and partially formal treatises on argument and dialectic, systems based on defeasible reasoning, and systems based on game semantics and dialogical logic.

== History ==
Since the late 20th century, European and American logicians have attempted to provide mathematical foundations for dialectic through formalisation, although logic has been related to dialectic since ancient times. There have been pre-formal and partially-formal treatises on argument and dialectic, from authors such as Stephen Toulmin (The Uses of Argument, 1958), Nicholas Rescher (Dialectics: A Controversy-Oriented Approach to the Theory of Knowledge, 1977), and Frans H. van Eemeren and Rob Grootendorst (pragma-dialectics, 1980s). One can include works of the communities of informal logic and paraconsistent logic.

== Defeasibility ==
Building on theories of defeasible reasoning (see John L. Pollock), systems have been built that define well-formedness of arguments, rules governing the process of introducing arguments based on fixed assumptions, and rules for shifting burden. Many of these logics appear in the special area of artificial intelligence and law, though the computer scientists' interest in formalizing dialectic originates in a desire to build decision support and computer-supported collaborative work systems.

== Dialogue games ==
Dialectic itself can be formalised as moves in a game, where an advocate for the truth of a proposition and an opponent argue. Such games can provide a semantics of logic, one that is very general in applicability.

== See also ==
- Argumentation framework
- Argumentation theory
- Logic and rationality
- Logic of argumentation
