= Pragma-dialectics =

Argumentation theory

Pragma-dialectics, or pragma-dialectical theory, developed by Frans H. van Eemeren and Rob Grootendorst at the University of Amsterdam, is an argumentation theory that is used to analyze and evaluate argumentation in actual practice. Unlike strictly logical approaches (which focus on the study of argument as product), or purely communication approaches (which emphasize argument as a process), pragma-dialectics was developed to study the entirety of an argumentation as a discourse activity. Thus, the pragma-dialectical theory views argumentation as a complex speech act that occurs as part of natural language activities and has specific communicative goals.

Pragma-dialectics posits an ideal model of a critical discussion with defined discussion stages, rules for critical discussion, and analytical operations. These have been applied to various fields of practice.

== The pragma-dialectical theory ==
=== Theoretical justification ===
In pragma-dialectics, argumentation is viewed as a communicative and interactional discourse phenomenon that is to be studied from a normative as well as a descriptive perspective. The dialectical dimension is inspired by normative insights from critical rationalism and formal dialectics, the pragmatic dimension by descriptive insights from speech act theory, Gricean language philosophy and discourse analysis.

To allow for the systematic integration of the pragmatic and dialectical dimensions in the study of argumentation, the pragma-dialectical theory uses four meta-theoretical principles as its point of departure: functionalization, socialization, externalization and dialectification. Functionalization is achieved by treating discourse as a purposive act. Socialization is achieved by extending the speech act perspective to the level of interaction. Externalization is achieved by capturing the propositional and interactional commitments created by the speech acts performed. And dialectification is achieved by regimenting the exchange of speech acts to an ideal model of a critical discussion.

=== The ideal model of a critical discussion ===
Based on the meta-theoretical principles described above, the pragma-dialectical theory regards argumentation as ideally being part of a critical discussion. The ideal model of a critical discussion treats argumentative discourse as a discussion in which argumentation is directed at the reasonable resolution of a difference of opinion. The ideal model can serve as a heuristic as well as a critical tool: it respectively constitutes an instrument for the argumentation analyst when deciding about the communicative functions of speech acts and provides a standard for argument evaluation.

==== Discussion stages ====
In this ideal model of a critical discussion, four discussion stages are distinguished that the discussion parties have to go through to resolve their difference of opinion: the confrontation stage, opening stage, argumentation stage and concluding stage. In the confrontation stage, the interlocutors establish that they have a difference of opinion. In the opening stage, they decide to resolve this difference of opinion. The interlocutors determine their points of departure: they agree upon the rules of the discussion and establish which propositions they can use in their argumentation. In the argumentation stage, the protagonist defends his/her standpoint by putting forward arguments to counter the antagonist's objections or doubt. In the concluding stage, the discussion parties evaluate to what extent their initial difference of opinion has been resolved and in whose favor. The model also defines the nature and distribution of the speech acts that play a constructive part in the various stages of the resolution process.

==== Rules for critical discussion ====
The ideal model stipulates ten rules that apply to an argumentative discussion. Violations of the discussion rules are said to frustrate the reasonable resolution of the difference of opinion and they are therefore considered as fallacies.

The ten rules are:

1. Freedom rule
  Parties must not prevent each other from advancing standpoints or from casting doubt on standpoints.
2. Burden of proof rule
  A party that advances a standpoint is obliged to defend it if asked by the other party to do so.
3. Standpoint rule
  A party's attack on a standpoint must relate to the standpoint that has indeed been advanced by the other party.
4. Relevance rule
  A party may defend a standpoint only by advancing argumentation relating to that standpoint.
5. Unexpressed premise rule
  A party may not deny premise that he or she has left implicit or falsely present something as a premise that has been left unexpressed by the other party.
6. Starting point rule
  A party may not falsely present a premise as an accepted starting point nor deny a premise representing an accepted starting point.
7. Argument scheme rule
  A party may not regard a standpoint as conclusively defended if the defense does not take place by means of an appropriate argumentation scheme that is correctly applied.
8. Validity rule
  A party may only use arguments in its argumentation that are logically valid or capable of being made logically valid by making explicit one or more unexpressed premises.
9. Closure rule
  A failed defense of a standpoint must result in the party that put forward the standpoint retracting it and a conclusive defense of the standpoint must result in the other party retracting its doubt about the standpoint.
10. Usage rule
  A party must not use formulations that are insufficiently clear or confusingly ambiguous and a party must interpret the other party's formulations as carefully and accurately as possible.

=== Strategic maneuvering ===
The pragma-dialectical theory of argumentation has incorporated insights from rhetoric into the analysis of argumentative discussion. Parties involved in a difference of opinion "maneuver strategically" to simultaneously realize their dialectical and their rhetorical aims. In other words, the parties in an argumentative discussion attempt to be persuasive (have their standpoint accepted) while observing the critical standards for argumentative discourse. In each of the critical discussion stages there is a rhetorical goal that corresponds with the dialectical goal and interlocutors can make use of three analytical aspects to balance effectiveness and reasonableness: making an opportune selection from the topical potential available at the stage concerned, approaching the audience effectively, and carefully exploiting presentational means. These three aspects correspond with some focal points of rhetorical study – topics, audience adaptation and presentational devices – so that insights acquired in rhetoric are brought to bear in explaining how rhetorical and dialectical considerations play a part in the various ways of strategic maneuvering.

== Analyzing and evaluating argumentative discourse ==
From a pragma-dialectical perspective, in order to get an overview of those aspects in argumentative discourse that are crucial for resolving a difference of opinion, the following analytical operations are carried out:

1. Determining the points at issue;
2. Recognizing the positions the parties adopt;
3. Identifying the explicit and implicit arguments;
4. Analyzing the argumentation structure.

An analytical overview shows the differences of opinion, the distribution of dialectical roles, the expressed and unexpressed premises that make up the argument, and the argumentation structure (the relationship between a series of arguments presented to defend a standpoint). The analytical overview can have critical or heuristic functions.

=== Critical function ===
Starting from the analytical overview, the evaluation of the quality of the argumentative discourse can be performed. In evaluating the arguments that are put forward in the argumentative discourse, the analyst should (1) check whether the discourse is free from logical and pragmatic inconsistencies, (2) determine whether the propositions put forward are acceptable, (3) evaluate whether the argumentation (can be made) logically valid, (4) check whether the argumentation schemes are appropriately applied, and (5) check for other fallacies.

=== Heuristic function ===
The concept of the analytical overview can also be used in argument production. Since the analytical overview brings together concisely all the information necessary for evaluating an argumentative discussion, it can be used to check whether the argumentation can stand up to criticism. If weaknesses are found, the argumentation can be adjusted or expanded thus it makes a useful guide for the creation of written or oral argumentation.

== Application of the pragma-dialectical theory ==
The pragma-dialectical theory has been applied to understand several different types of argumentative discourse. For example, it has been used to analyze and evaluate legal argumentation, mediation, negotiation, (parliamentary) debate, interpersonal argumentation, political argumentation, health communication and visual argumentation.
