= Charles Willard =

Charles Willard may refer to:

- Charles Willard (golfer), American golfer
- Charles Andrew Willard (1857–1914), United States federal judge
- Charles Arthur Willard (born 1945), American academic
- Charles W. Willard (1827–1880), U.S. Representative from Vermont
- Charles F. Willard (1883–1977), American aviator and engineer
