= Joseph W. Wenzel =

American academic rhetorician (1933–2021)

- Born: 30 November 1933
- Died: 30 December 2021 (aged 88)
- Scientific career
- Fields: Argumentation
- Workplaces: University of Illinois Urbana-Champaign

Joseph W. Wenzel (November 30, 1933 – December 30 2021) was an American argumentation and rhetorical scholar. He was Professor Emeritus at the University of Illinois Urbana-Champaign.

He has lectured in the Netherlands. He has published in Communication Monographs, Journal of the American Forensic Association, Quarterly Journal of Speech, and Argumentation.

His students include Dale Hample, Daniel J. O'Keefe, and Charles Arthur Willard. His seminal contribution to argument theory appears in 1979: ‘Jurgen Habermas and the Dialectical Perspective on Argumentation’, Journal of the American Forensic Association 16, 83–94. He has published 30 articles and book chapters on topics in rhetoric and argumentation. He received awards for publications from the Midwest Forensic Association and the American Forensic Association. He has been a frequent presenter at conferences in America and abroad, including a keynote address at the First International Conference on Argumentation in Amsterdam in 1986. He was Editor of the Journal of the American Forensic Association, 1983–86, and has served on the editorial boards of Argumentation, Central States Speech Journal, Communication Monographs, Informal Logic and Quarterly Journal of Speech.
