= Charles Arthur Willard =

American argumentation and rhetorical theorist

- Born: August 1945; Hutchinson, Kansas
- Died: November 22, 2021 (aged 76); Orlando, Florida

Academic background
- Education: University of Illinois
- Influences: Joseph W. Wenzel, G. Thomas Goodnight

Academic work
- Main interests: Argumentation theory, rhetoric, modernity, social epistemology, sociology of knowledge
- Notable ideas: Social grounds of knowledge, argument fields

Charles Arthur Willard (born 1945; died 2021) was an American argumentation and rhetorical theorist. He was a retired Professor and University Scholar at the University of Louisville in Louisville, Kentucky, US.

== Education ==
He received his undergraduate degree at the Kansas State Teachers College, Emporia, Kansas. He received his master's degree and doctorate at the University of Illinois Urbana-Champaign, Urbana.

== Academic appointments ==
From 1974 to 1982 he was the Director of Forensics at Dartmouth College, Hanover, New Hampshire (US). He has lectured in Austria, Canada, France, Belgium, Germany, Italy, and the Netherlands. He has studied at the Netherlands Institute for Advanced Study in the Social Sciences, at Waasner, Holland. He has also taught at Slippery Rock State College and the University of Pittsburgh in Pennsylvania.

== Major works ==
His most important works include Argumentation and the Social Grounds of Knowledge (1982) and A Theory of Argumentation (1988). He has published monographs in and served on editorial boards for Communication Monographs, Informal Logic, Journal of the American Forensics Association, Argumentation, Social Epistemology and the Quarterly Journal of Speech. He has published more than 50 articles and book chapters on topics in rhetoric and argumentation. He was one of the founders and for many years was a co-director of the International Association for the Study of Argumentation based at the University of Amsterdam in the Netherlands. He has co-edited the proceedings of five of that organization's international conferences. He has recently co-edited with Frans van Eemeren, J. Anthony Blair, and A. Francisca Henkemans Anyone Who Has A View: Theoretical Contributions to the Study of Argumentation. Dordrecht: Kluwer. 2003. He has received distinguished scholarship awards from the National Communication Association, the American Forensics Association, and the Universities of Illinois and Louisville. Four of his books have received the Daniel H. Rohor Distinguished Scholarship Award from the American Forensic Association.

His Liberalism and the Problem of Knowledge: A New Rhetoric for Modern Democracy (1996) debunks the discourse of liberalism, arguing that its exaggerated ideals of authenticity, unity, and community have deflected attention from the pervasive incompetence of the rule by experts. He proposes a ground of communication that emphasizes common interests rather than narrow disputes.

== Selected works ==
- 1982 — Argumentation and the Social Grounds of Knowledge, University of Alabama Press
- 1982 — Advances in Argumentation Theory and Research (with J. Robert Cox)
- 1988 — A Theory of Argumentation, University of Alabama Press
- 1996 — Liberalism and the Problem of Knowledge: A New Rhetoric for Modern Democracy, Chicago: University of Chicago Press. ISBN 9780226898452; OCLC 260223405
- 2004 — Critical problems in Argumentation: Proceedings of the Thirteenth NCA/AFA Conference on Argumentation, Washington, DC: National Communication Association
- "Argument," in Theresa Enos, Ed., Encyclopedia of Rhetoric and Composition. New York: Garland, 1996, pages 16–26.
- "L'Argumentation et les Fondements Sociaux de la Connaissance," in Alain Lempereur, ed. L'Argumentation. Liege: Pierre Mardaga, 1992.
- "The Problem of the Public Sphere: Three Diagnoses," in David Cratis Williams and Michael David Hazen, eds., Argumentation Theory and the Rhetoric of Assent. Tuscaloosa: University of Alabama Press, 1990.
- "Argumentation and Postmodern Critique," in J. Schuetz and R. Trapp, eds., Perspectives on Argument. Waveland, 1990.
- "Argument Fields: A Cartesian Meditation," in George Ziegelmueller and Jack Rhodes, eds., Dimensions of Argument: Proceedings of the Second S.C.A./A.F.A. Summer Conference on Argumentation (Annadale: Speech Communication Association, 1981).
- "On the Utility of Descriptive Diagrams for the Analysis and Criticism of Argument," Communication Monographs, 64 (1976), pages 308–319.
