= Joseph Wenzel =

Joseph Wenzel may refer to:

- Joseph W. Wenzel (1933-2021), American argumentation and rhetorical scholar
- Prince Joseph Wenzel of Liechtenstein (born 1995)
- Joseph Wenzel I, Prince of Liechtenstein (1696–1772)
- Joseph Wenzel, Prince of Fürstenberg (1728–1783), German nobleman
