= Probabilistic argument =

Probabilistic argument may refer to:

- Probabilistic argument, any argument involving probability theory
- Probabilistic method, a method of non-constructive existence proof in mathematics
- Probabilistic argumentation in formal frameworks pertaining to probabilistic logic
