= Cayrol =

Cayrol is a French surname. Notable people with the surname include:

- Claudette Cayrol (born 1959), French computer scientist
- Clemente Cayrol, Argentine politician
- Dominique Cayrol (1890–1946), French resistance fighter
- Étienne Cayrol (1898–1990), French rugby player
- Florence Cayrol (born 1949), French actress
- Jean Cayrol (1911–2005), French poet and publisher
- Joan Cayrol i Obiols (1921–1981), French poet
- Louis Nicolas Jean Joachim de Cayrol (1775–1859), French politician
- Roland Cayrol (born 1941), French political scientist

== See also ==
- Cayrols, commune in the Cantal department of France
- Le Cayrol, commune in the Aveyron department of France
