= Leila Amgoud =

Algerian and French computer scientist

- Citizenship: Algeria
- Education: Toulouse III - Paul Sabatier University
- Occupations: computer scientist, director
- Employer: French National Centre for Scientific Research (CNRS)
- Honours: fellow of the European Association for Artificial Intelligence

Leila Amgoud is a computer scientist, a director of research for the French National Centre for Scientific Research (CNRS), the deputy director of the Toulouse Institute of Computer Science Research (IRIT), and the holder of a chair for argumentation in the Artificial and Natural Intelligence Toulouse Institute (ANITI). Her research involves argumentation for explainable artificial intelligence.

== Education and career ==
Amgoud was born in Algeria, and studied at the Algerian Higher National School of Computer Science. She has a 1999 PhD from Toulouse III - Paul Sabatier University. Her doctoral dissertation, Contribution a l'integration des preferences dans le raisonnement argumentatif, was sustained under the direction of Claudette Cayrol.

She became a researcher for the French National Centre for Scientific Research (CNRS) in 2001, after postdoctoral research in England. She was named a director of research for the CNRS in 2007. In 2009, she completed a habilitation with the thesis Contributions to argumentation theory and its applications.

== Recognition ==
Amgoud is a fellow of the European Association for Artificial Intelligence.
