= G. Thomas Goodnight =

American academic (1948–2026)

- Born: Gerald Thomas Goodnight; December 4, 1948; Houston, Texas, U.S.
- Died: July 28, 2026 (aged 77); Batesville, Arkansas, U.S.
- Scientific career
- Institutions: University of Southern California

Gerald Thomas Goodnight (December 4, 1948 – July 28, 2026) was an American argumentation and rhetorical scholar.

== Early life and education ==
Gerald Thomas Goodnight was born in Houston, Texas, on December 4, 1948. He obtained a Bachelor of Science degree in political science from the University of Houston, in 1971 and a Master of Arts, in 1974. He received a Ph.D. from the University of Kansas, in 1977.

== Career ==
Goodnight was a professor and director of doctoral studies in the Annenberg School for Communication at the University of Southern California. He has published essays in Communication Monographs, Communication Theory, Journal of the American Forensic Association, Quarterly Journal of Speech, and Argumentation. He has lectured in France, Belgium, Germany, Italy, Yugoslavia, and the Netherlands.

His seminal contribution to the field of argumentation theory lies in his approach to "spheres of argument," an idea that has sparked many scholarly studies. Before joining USC full-time in 2004, Goodnight taught undergraduate and graduate courses in Northwestern University's Communication Studies department in contemporary rhetorical theory, criticism, theory of argumentation, and the public sphere. His current research interests include deliberation and postwar society, science communication, argument and aesthetics, public discourse studies, and communicative reason in controversy.

Goodnight has been recognised by the American Forensics Association as one of the top five scholars in argumentation in the 20th century.

== Death ==
Goodnight died in Batesville, Arkansas, on July 28, 2026, at the age of 77.
