= Practical arguments =

Method of claim validation

Practical arguments are a logical structure used to determine the validity or dependencies of a claim made in natural-language arguments.

== Overview... ==
An argument can be thought of as two or more contradicting tree structures.

- The root of each tree is a claim: a belief supported by information.
- The root branches out to nodes that are grounds: supporting information.
- The edges connecting them are warrants: rules or principles.
- Claims, grounds and warrants are often not known for certain, so they are presented with a qualifier to indicate their probability.
- When a ground is disputable it is a sub claim; in this way the tree can grow to be quite large.

The object of a discussion is often to resolve a difference of opinion. This requires common grounds from which to logically convince one's opponent that one's claim is better supported and that the opponent's claim is supported by false grounds and or warrants (see Occam's razor). If one has no grounds or warrants to support one's claim, then one has no argument, just a belief/claim, perhaps an inaccurate one.

== Example 1 ==
- Claim: Cats are less intelligent than dogs.
- Ground: Cats cannot learn to do tricks as well as dogs do.
- Warrant: The ability to learn tricks is a mark of intelligence.

== Example 2 ==
Where: C=claim, W=warrant, G=ground, and Q=qualifier

Practical argument tree

- C: Humans can't fly.
  - Q: In a gravity field without assistance or modification
  - W1: Because it defies the laws of Newtonian physics it can not be done.
    - Q: Fact
  - G1: It defies the laws of Newtonian physics.
    - Q: Disputable fact
  - W1.1: Because Newtonian physics applies it would defy the laws of Newtonian physics.
    - Q: Fact
  - G1.1: Newtonian physics apply to all super quantum systems including people
    - Q: Fact
  - W1.2: Because there is no print record it is highly improbable.
    - Q: Highly improbable
  - G1.2: There is no print record of any reputable person claiming such a thing.
    - Q: Fact
  - W2: Because no one has ever flown, it is highly improbable.
    - Q: Highly improbable
  - G2: No one has ever flown.
    - Q: Disputable fact
  - W2.1: Because there is no print record it is highly improbable.
    - Q: Highly improbable
  - G2.1: There is no print record of any reputable person claiming such a thing.
    - Q: Fact

== See also ==
- Argument map
- Argumentation framework
- Logical argument
- Toulmin model of argument
