= Claudette Cayrol =

French computer scientist

- Born: 1954 (age 71–72)

Academic background
- Education: Paul Sabatier University (PhD, habilitation)

Academic work
- Discipline: Computer scientist
- Sub-discipline: Artificial intelligence; Logic of argumentation
- Institutions: Paul Sabatier University

Claudette Cayrol (born 1959) is a retired French computer scientist specializing in artificial intelligence and the logic of argumentation. Formerly a professor at Paul Sabatier University, she retired in 2019.

Cayrol earned a third-cycle doctorate in 1984 and a university doctorate in 1986 from Paul Sabatier University. She completed a habilitation there in 1995.

Her doctoral students at Paul Sabatier University included Leila Amgoud.
