= Pragmatic ethics =

Theory of normative philosophical ethics and meta-ethics

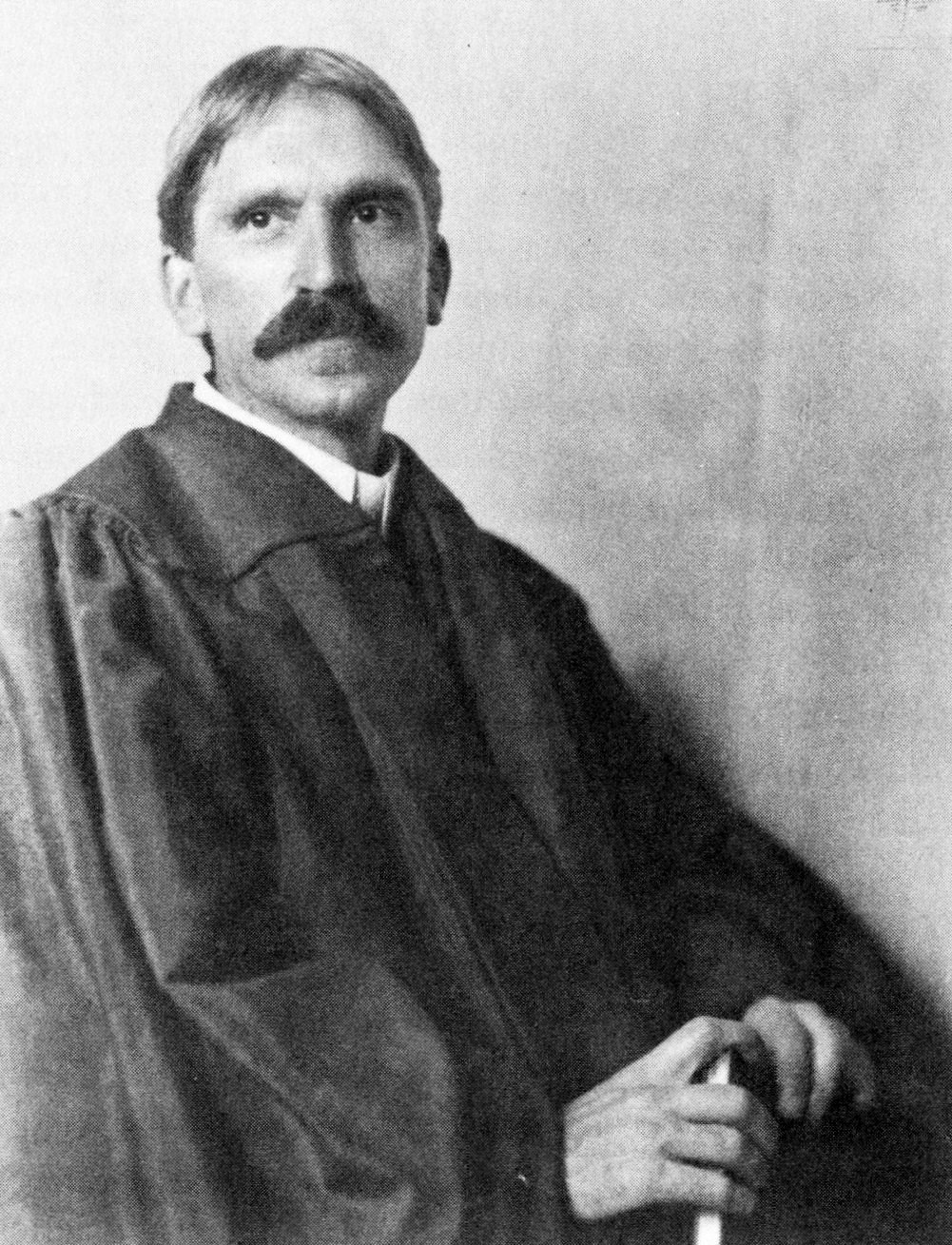
Pragmatic ethics was discussed by John Dewey (pictured at the University of Chicago in 1902, before his major works on pragmatic ethics were published).

Pragmatic ethics is a theory of normative philosophical ethics and meta-ethics that is associated with pragmatism, a philosophical movement that developed around the turn of the 20th century. Ethical pragmatists such as John Dewey believe that some societies have progressed morally in much the way they have attained progress in science. Scientists can pursue inquiry into the truth of a hypothesis and accept the hypothesis, in the sense that they act as though the hypothesis were true; nonetheless, they think that future generations can advance science, and thus future generations can refine or replace (at least some of) their accepted hypotheses. Similarly, ethical pragmatists think that norms, principles, and moral criteria are likely to be improved as a result of inquiry.

Martin Benjamin used Neurath's boat as an analogy for pragmatic ethics, likening the gradual change of ethical norms to the reconstruction of a ship at sea by its sailors.

== Contrast with other normative theories ==
Much as it is appropriate for scientists to act as though a hypothesis were true despite expecting future inquiry to supplant it, ethical pragmatists acknowledge that it can be appropriate to practice a variety of other normative approaches (e.g. consequentialism, deontological ethics, and virtue ethics), yet acknowledge the need for mechanisms that allow people to advance beyond such approaches, a freedom for discourse which does not take any such theory as assumed. Thus, aimed at social innovation, the practice of pragmatic ethics supplements the practice of other normative approaches with what John Stuart Mill called "experiments in living".

Pragmatic ethics also differs from other normative approaches theoretically, according to Hugh LaFollette:

1. It focuses on society, rather than on lone individuals, as the entity that achieves morality. In Dewey's words, "all conduct is ... social".
2. It does not hold any known moral criteria as beyond potential for revision. Pragmatic ethics may be misunderstood as relativist, as failing to be objective, but pragmatists object to this critique on grounds that the same could be said of science, yet inductive and hypothetico-deductive science is our epistemological standard. Ethical pragmatists can maintain that their endeavor, like inquiry in science, is objective on the grounds that it converges towards something objective (a thesis called Peircean realism named after C. S. Peirce).
3. It allows that a moral judgment may be accepted in one age of a given society, even though it will cease to be accepted after that society morally progresses (or may already be rejected in another society). The change in moral judgments about slavery that led to the abolition of slavery is an example of the improvement of moral judgments through moral inquiry and advocacy.

LaFollette based his account of pragmatic ethics in the writings of John Dewey, but he also found aspects of pragmatic ethics in the texts of Aristotle, John Stuart Mill, and Martha Nussbaum.

Barry Kroll, commenting on the pragmatic ethics of Anthony Weston, noted that pragmatic ethics emphasizes the complexity of problems and the many different values that may be involved in an ethical issue or situation, without suppressing the conflicts between such values.

== Criticisms ==
Pragmatic ethics has been criticized for conflating descriptive ethics with normative ethics, as describing the way people do make moral judgments rather than the way they should make them, or in other words for lacking normative standards. While some ethical pragmatists may have avoided the distinction between normative and descriptive truth, the theory of pragmatic ethics itself does not conflate them any more than science conflates truth about its subject matter with current opinion about it; in pragmatic ethics as in science, "truth emerges from the self-correction of error through a sufficiently long process of inquiry". A normative criterion that many pragmatists emphasize is the degree to which the process of social learning is deliberatively democratic: "while deontologists focus on moral duties and obligations and utilitarians on the greatest happiness of the greatest number, pragmatists concentrate on coexistence and cooperation".

== Moral ecology ==
In Tim Dean's account, moral ecology is a variation of pragmatic ethics that additionally supposes that morality evolves like an ecosystem, and ethical practice should therefore include strategies analogous to those of ecosystem management, such as protecting a degree of moral diversity. The term "moral ecology" has been used since at least 1985 to imply a symbiosis whereby the viability of any existing moral approach would be diminished by the destruction of all alternative approaches. Dean theorized that humans take diverse approaches to morality, and such polymorphism gives humanity resilience against a wider range of situations and environments, which makes moral diversity a natural consequence of frequency-dependent selection.

== See also ==
- Applied ethics
- Good reasons approach
- Moral constructivism
