= Dale Hample =

Academic background
- Education: Ohio State University; University of Illinois Urbana-Champaign

Dale Hample is an American argumentation and rhetorical scholar, associate professor at the University of Maryland, College Park. He has published many peer-reviewed journal articles, book chapters, and written one book and edited another.

He received a bachelor of science in economics in 1971 from Ohio State University, and a A.M. in speech in 1972 and Ph.D. in speech communication in 1975, both from the University of Illinois at Urbana-Champaign.

He then taught at Western Illinois University until 2007, when he took a teaching position at Maryland. Some of his major accomplishments include developing measures for the ways in which people edit arguments (cognitive editorial standards), discussing how people produce argumentative discourse (inventional capacity), and how they view arguments (argument frames and taking conflict personally).

He is currently the editor of Argumentation and Advocacy, and editor of the Issues Forum of Communication Monographs, and is on the editorial boards for ten other journals in his subject.

== Publications ==
=== Books ===
- Hample, D Arguing: Exchanging Reasons Face to Face Lawrence Erlbaum Associates; 2005. ISBN 0-8058-4854-1.
- Benoit, W.L., Hample, D., & Benoit, P. (Eds.) (1992). Readings in Argumentation. Berlin: Foris.

=== Journal articles ===
- Hample, D., Warner, B., & Norton, H. (2006). The effects of arguing expectations and predispositions on perceptions of argument quality and playfulness. Argumentation and Advocacy, 43(1), pages 1–13.
- Hample, D., Thompson-Hayes, M., Wallenfelsz, K., Wallenfelsz, P., & Knapp, C. (2005). "Face-to-face arguing is an emotional experience: Triangulating methodologies and early findings." Argumentation and Advocacy, 42, pages 74–93.
- Cortes, C., Larson, C., & Hample, D. (2005). Relations among message design logic, interpersonal construct differentiation, and sex for Mexican and U.S. nationals. Journal of Intercultural Communication Research, 34, pages 108–118.
- Hample, D. (2000). Cognitive editing of arguments and reasons for requests: Evidence from think-aloud protocols. Argumentation and Advocacy, 37, pages 98–108.
- Hample, D. (1999). The life space of personalized conflicts. Communication Yearbook, 22, pages 171–208.
- Hample, D., Benoit, P. J., Houston, J., Purifoy, G., VanHyfte, V., & Wardell, C. (1999). Naive theories of argument: Avoiding interpersonal arguments or cutting them short. Argumentation and Advocacy, 35, pages 130–139.
- Hample, D., & Dallinger, J. M. (1998). On the etiology of the rebuff phenomenon: Why are persuasive messages less polite after rebuffs? Communication Studies, 49, pages 305–321.
- Dallinger, J.M., & Hample, D. (1995). Personalizing and managing conflict. International Journal of Conflict Management, 6, 287–289.
- Hample, D., & Dallinger, J.M. (1995). A Lewinian perspective on taking conflict personally: Revision, refinement, and validation of the instrument. Communication Quarterly, 43, pages 297–319.
- Dallinger, J. M., & Hample, D. (1994). The effects of gender on compliance gaining strategy endorsement and suppression. Communication Reports, 7, pages 43–49.
- Hample, D. (1992). Writing mindlessly. Communication Monographs, 59, 315–323.
- Hample, D., & Dallinger, J.M. (1992). The use of multiple goals in cognitive editing of arguments. Argumentation and Advocacy, 28, pages 109–122.
- Hample, D., & Dallinger, J.M. (1991). Message design logic, goal structure, interpersonal construct differentiation, and situation. In D. W. Parson (Ed.), Argument in Controversy (pages 188–192). Annandale, Virginia: Speech Communication Association.
- Hample, D. (1990). Debate as a civic act. Applying Research to the Classroom, 8, 1–2.
- Hample, D., & Dallinger, J.M. (1990). Arguers as editors. Argumentation, 4, pages 153–169.
- Dallinger, J.M., & Hample, D. (1988). Supervisor accessibility and job characteristics. Communication Research Reports, 5, pages 4–9.
- Hample, D., & Dallinger, J.M. (1987). Self-monitoring and the cognitive editing of arguments. Central States Speech Journal, 38, pages 152–165.
- Hample, D., & Dallinger, J.M. (1987). Cognitive editing of argument strategies. Human Communication Research, 14, pages 123–144.
- Hample, D. (1987). The role of the unconscious in nonverbal information processing. Semiotica, 67, pages 211–231.
- Hample, D. (1986). Argumentation and the unconscious. Journal of the American Forensic Association, 23, pages 82–95.
- Hample, D. (1986). Logic, conscious and unconscious. Western Journal of Speech Communication, 50, pages 24–40.
- Hample, D. (1985). Refinements on the cognitive model of argument. Western Journal of Speech Communication, 49, pages 267–285.
- Hample, D. (1985). Teaching the cognitive context of argument. Communication Education, 34, pages 196–204.
- Hample, D. (1985). A third perspective on argument. Philosophy and Rhetoric, 18, pages 1–22.
- Hample, D. (1984). On the use of self-reports. Journal of the American Forensic Association, 20, pages 140–153.
- Hample, D. (1982). Dual coding, reasoning and fallacies. Journal of the American Forensic Association, 19, pages 59–78.
- Hample, D. (1981). Forensics research in the 1980s. Forensic, 66, pages 20–25.
- Thompson, W.N., Hample, D., Hunt, S., & Pruett, R. (1981). What Is CEDA Debate? Forensic, 66, pages 4–9.
- Hample, D. (1981). The cognitive context of argument. Western Journal of Speech Communication, 45, pages 148–158.
- Hample, D. (1980). A cognitive view of argument. Journal of the American Forensic Association, 17, pages 151–158.
- Hample, D. (1980). Purposes and effects of lying. Southern Speech Communication Journal, 46, pages 33–47.
- Hample, D. (1980). Motives in law: An adaptation of legal realism. Journal of the American Forensic Association, 15, 156–168.
- Blimling, G. S., & Hample, D. (1979). Structuring the peer environment in residence halls to increase academic performance in average-ability students. Journal of College Student Personnel, 20, pages 310–316.
- Hample, D. (1979). Predicting belief and belief change using a cognitive theory of argument and evidence. Communication Monographs, 46, pages 142–146.
- Hample, D. (1978). Are attitudes arguable? Journal of Value Inquiry, 12, pages 311–312.
- Hample, D. (1978). Predicting immediate belief change and adherence to argument claims. Communication Monographs, 45, 219–228.
- Hample, D., & Hample, J. (1978). Evidence credibility. Debate Issues, 12, pages 4–5.
- Hample, D. (1977). Testing a model of value argument and evidence. Communication Monographs, 14, pages 106–120.
- Hample, D. (1977). The Toulmin model and the syllogism. Journal of the American Forensic Association, 14, pages 1–9.
- Wenzel, J.W., & Hample, D. (1975). Categories and dimensions of value propositions: Exploratory studies. Journal of the American Forensic Association, 11, pages 121–130.

=== Other publications ===
He has also published over two dozen chapters in specialized books and encyclopedias, and over 50 conference presentations.
