= June Goodfield =

English writer (1927–2025)

Gwyneth June Goodfield (1 June 1927 – 13 February 2025) was a British historian, scientist and writer of both fiction and non-fiction.

== Life and career ==
Born Gwyneth June Goodfield in Stratford-upon-Avon on 1 June 1927, she read zoology at the University of London and undertook a PhD in history and philosophy of science at Leeds University, graduating in 1959, and spending the following year as a research assistant at Oxford University. After teaching biology at Benenden School, Kent, and Cheltenham Ladies' College, Goodfield lectured in history and philosophy of science at Leeds University until 1960. She was consultant at Harvard University's Department of Education (1960–65), professor of history and philosophy of science at Wellesley College (1966–69), professor of human medicine and philosophy at Michigan State University (1969–78), senior research fellow at the Rockefeller University (1977–82), and Robinson Professor at George Mason University, Fairfax, Virginia.

Goodfield has participated in the work of professional bodies, including the Institute of Society, Ethics and the Life Sciences, the American Association for the Advancement of Science, the Zoological Society, and the Royal Society of Medicine. She was president of the United Nations Association in 1986–1987.

Goodfield married Stephen Toulmin in 1960, and collaborated with him on a series of books on the history of science, including The Architecture of Matter (1962) and The Discovery of Time (1966). In the 1970s and 1980s she wrote on the battle against disease, particularly The Siege of Cancer (1975) and Quest for the Killers (1985), which described the epidemiological search for the cause and cure of five deadly diseases: Kuru, Hepatitis B, Schistosomiasis, leprosy, and smallpox.

Her book An Imagined World described five years spent with one scientist, tackling the question of whether and how the personality of a scientist is expressed in their work.

The second major book, Science and the Media, was commissioned by the American Association for the Advancement of Science.

Goodfield produced and directed a number of scientific films, winning several awards. Her 1964 film on the development of the cell theory, The Perfection of Life, won second prize at the Sydney Scientific Film Festival. Her five-part television series From the Face of the Earth, broadcast in the United Kingdom and in the United States (as Quest for the Killers) won the British Association for the Advancement of Science Award for the best television series in 1985.

While at the Rockefeller University she founded International Health and Biomedicine (UK/USA), a not-for-profit organisation whose objective was to enhance public understanding of science and its impact on global health problems.

Goodfield wrote several books on the history of her native Sussex, including Deans Place (2006) and Stanmer & the Pelhams (2007) and Wingrove and the Churchill Connection, in collaboration with fellow historian Peter Robinson.

Her work Rivers of Time: Why is everyone talking to Philippa? (2008) was inspired by a seventeenth-century memorial on the Caribbean island of Nevis. In the seventeenth century, women rarely had dedicated memorials in their own right. The discovery of a marker tablet in the lee of Saddle Hill, at the southern end of Nevis, giving the name of a woman who died in 1683, triggered a quest lasting many years. Nevis is a small island that has been influential in the history of both Great Britain and America, with links to Alexander Hamilton, Lord Nelson, and Diana, Princess of Wales. The mystery of the marker tablet is now solved; her book is being made into a film.

In September 2008, Goodfield participated in the launch of a new personal and social history recording website called the Times of My Life. She gave a speech on the importance of leaving a written legacy behind and was joined at the event by World War II singer Dame Vera Lynn and actor and explorer Brian Blessed.

In 2008 she founded SAFE (Save Alfriston for Everyone), a local charity which seeks to resolve the traffic problem suffered by the Sussex village of Alfriston. She was an active member of Alfriston Parish Council, and Chairman of the Alfriston & Cuckmere Valley Historical Society.

Goodfield died on 13 February 2025, at the age of 97.

== Non fiction works ==
- The Growth of Scientific Physiology (1960)
- The Fabric of the Heavens: The Development of Astronomy and Dynamics (with Stephen Toulmin) (1961)
- The Architecture of Matter (with Stephen Toulmin) (1962)
- The Discovery of Time (with Stephen Toulmin) (1965)
- The Siege of Cancer (1975)
- Playing God : Genetic Engineering and the Manipulation of Life (1977)
- An Imagined World : A Story of Scientific Discovery (1981)
- Reflections on Science and the Media (1981)
- Quest for the Killers (1985)
- A Chance to Live (1991)
- Peace in our Time? (with Mary Anne Fitzgerald) (1991)
- The Planned Miracle (1991)
- Deans Place (with Peter Robinson) (2006)
- Stanmer & the Pelhams (with Peter Robinson) (2007)
- Rivers of Time: Why is everyone talking to Philippa? (2008)
- Wingrove and the Churchill Connection (2010)

== Fiction works ==
- Courier to Peking (1973)
- Rotten at the Core (2001)

== Films and documentaries ==
- A Challenge of Life
- Time is (1964) (producer)
- The Perfection of Life (1964)
- The Perfection of Matter
- The God Within
- From the Face of the Earth (1985)
- The Planned Miracle (1990)
- The Cosmic Joke and Apocalypse Later (1992)
- From Out of the People (1998)
