= Good reasons approach =

Meta-ethical theory

The good reasons approach is a meta-ethical theory that ethical conduct is justified if the actor has good reasons for that conduct. The good reasons approach is not opposed to ethical theory per se, but is antithetical to wholesale justifications of morality and stresses that our moral conduct requires no further ontological or other foundation beyond concrete justifications. It is associated mainly with the ideas of Stephen Toulmin, Jon Wheatley and Kai Nielsen.

== See also ==
- Pragmatic ethics
- Moral particularism
