= Argumentum a fortiori =

Argument from a yet stronger reason

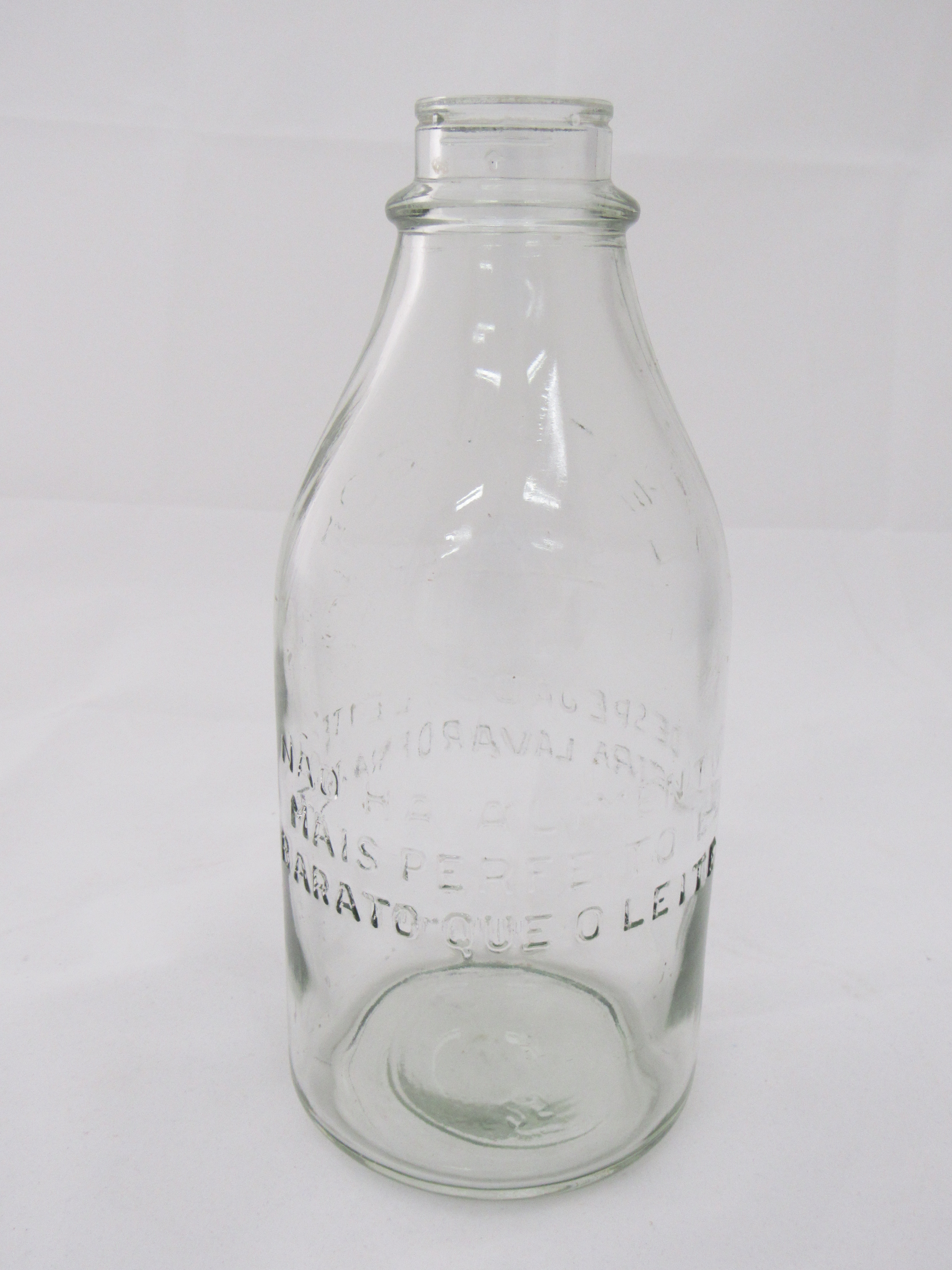
Where a bottle is known to be able to hold a pint of liquid, it could a fortiori be argued that it would also be able to hold half a pint.

Argumentum a fortiori (literally "argument from the stronger [reason]") (UK: /ˈɑː fɔːrtiˈoʊri/, US: /ˈeɪ fɔːrʃiˈɔːraɪ/) is a form of argumentation that draws upon existing confidence in a proposition to argue in favour of a second proposition that is held to be implicit in, or even more certain than, the first.

== Usage ==
=== American usage ===
In Garner's Modern American Usage, Garner says writers sometimes use a fortiori as an adjective, although he writes it is "a usage to be resisted". He provides this example: "Clearly, if laws depend so heavily on public acquiescence, the case of conventions is an a fortiori [read even more compelling] one."

=== Jewish usage ===
A fortiori arguments are regularly used in Jewish law under the name kal va-chomer, literally "mild and severe", the mild case being the one we know about, while trying to infer about the more severe case.

=== Relation to ancient Indian logic ===
In ancient Indian logic (nyaya), the instrument of argumentation known as kaimutika or kaimutya nyaya is found to have a resemblance with a fortiori argument. Kaimutika has been derived from the words kim uta meaning "what is to be said of".

=== Islamic usage ===
In Islamic jurisprudence, a fortiori arguments are proved utilising the methods used in qiyas (reasoning by analogy).

== Examples ==
- If a person is dead (the stronger reason), then one can, with equal or greater certainty, argue a fortiori that the person is not breathing. "Being dead" trumps other arguments that might be made to show that the person is dead, such as "he is no longer breathing"; therefore, "he is no longer breathing" is an extrapolation from his being dead and is a derivation of this strong argument.
- If it is known that a person is dead on a certain date, it may be inferred a fortiori that he is exempted from the suspect list for a murder that took place on a later date, viz. "Allen died on 2 April, therefore, a fortiori, Allen did not murder Joe on 3 April".
- If driving 10 km over the speed limit is punishable by a fine of $50, it can be inferred a fortiori that driving 20 km over the speed limit is also punishable by a fine of at least $50.
- If a teacher refuses to add 5 points to a student's grade because the student does not deserve an additional 5 points, it can be inferred a fortiori that the teacher will also refuse to raise the student's grade by 10 points.
- If married couples are forbidden from sharing a room, for example in a hotel, it can be inferred a fortiori that unmarried couples will also be unable to share a room.

=== In mathematics ===
Consider the case where there is a single necessary and sufficient condition required to satisfy some axiom. Given some theorem with an additional restriction imposed upon this axiom, an "a fortiori" proof will always hold. To demonstrate this, consider the following case:

1. For any set A, there does not exist a function mapping A onto its powerset P(A). (Even if A were empty, the powerset would still contain the empty set.)
2. There cannot exist a one-to-one correspondence between A and P(A).

Because bijections are a special case of onto functions, it automatically follows that if (1) holds, then (2) will also hold. Therefore, any proof of (1) also suffices as a proof of (2). Thus, (2) is an "a fortiori" argument.

== Types ==
=== A maiore ad minus ===
In logic, a maiore ad minus describes a simple and obvious inference from a claim about a stronger entity, greater quantity, or general class to one about a weaker entity, smaller quantity, or specific member of that class:

- From general to particular ("What holds for all X also holds for one particular X")
- From greater to smaller ("If a door is big enough for a person two metres high, then a shorter person may also come through"; "If a canister may store ten litres of petrol, then it may also store three litres of petrol.")
- From the whole to the part ("If the law permits a testator to revoke the entirety of a bequest by destroying or altering the document expressing it, then the law also permits a testator to revoke the portion of a bequest contained in a given portion of a document by destroying or altering that portion of the document.")
- From stronger to weaker ("If one may safely use a rope to tow a truck, one may also use it to tow a car.")

=== A minore ad maius ===
The reverse, less known and less frequently applicable argument is a minore ad maius, which denotes an inference from smaller to bigger.

== In law ==
"Argumentum a maiori ad minus" (from the greater to the smaller) – works in two ways:

- "who may more, all the more so may less" (qui potest plus, potest minus) and relates to the statutory provisions that permit to do something
- "who is ordered more, all the more so, is ordered less" and relates to the statutory provisions that order to do something

An a fortiori argument is sometimes considered in terms of analogical reasoning – especially in its legal applications. Reasoning a fortiori posits not merely that a case regulated by precedential or statutory law and an unregulated case should be treated alike since these cases sufficiently resemble each other, but that the unregulated case deserves to be treated in the same way as the regulated case in a higher degree. The unregulated case is here more similar (analogues) to the regulated case than this case is similar (analogues) to itself.

== See also ==
- Argumentation theory
- Principle of sufficient reason
- Rhetoric
