= Othello error =

Misinterpretation of stress as a suspicious attitude

Othello error occurs when a suspicious observer discounts cues of truthfulness. Essentially the Othello error occurs, Paul Ekman states, "when the lie catcher fails to consider that a truthful person who is under stress may appear to be lying," their non-verbal signals expressing their worry at the possibility of being disbelieved. A lie-detector or polygraph may be deceived in the same way by misinterpreting nervous signals from a truthful person. The error is named after William Shakespeare's tragic play Othello; the dynamics between the two main characters, Othello and Desdemona, are a particularly well-known example of the error in practice.

== History ==
The phrase "Othello error" was first used in the book Telling Lies by Paul Ekman in 1985. The name was coined from Shakespeare's play Othello, which provides an "excellent and famous example" of what can happen when fear and distress upon confrontation do not signal deception. In the play, Othello falsely believes that his wife, Desdemona, has been cheating on him with another man. When confronted, she cries and denies it, all the while aware that her mien will be taken as evidence of guilt by her jealous husband. Seeing his wife's emotional distress, Othello ignores alternative, innocent explanations—like the possibility that she did not love another—and kills her, as his preconceptions biased his observation and, therefore, his judgments.

Othello made the mistake of assuming that he understood the source of Desdemona's anguish. He assumed that his wife's sobs when confronted were a sign of her guilt; he didn't understand that her grief was rooted not in guilt, but in her knowledge that there was no way to convince her husband of her innocence.

== Interpersonal deception theory ==
Interpersonal deception theory is the fundamental deception that can occur between two (or more) people face-to-face and is what drives the Othello error. David Buller and Judee Burgoon coined this theory after 25 experiments in which they would ask one participant to attempt to deceive another. They concluded that people often say things that are not the truth "to avoid hurting or offending another person, to emphasize their best qualities, to avoid getting into a conflict, or to speed up or slow down a relationship." Following the lead of others who study verbal deceit, Buller and Burgoon label these three strategies falsification, concealment, and equivocation. The three differ in that falsification creates a fiction, concealment hides a secret, and equivocation dodges the issue, yet all three are types of deception.

Buller and Burgoon think that the Othello error is typical of most interactions where honesty is an issue. Their theory explains why detection of deception (and detection of truth telling) is a hit-and-miss business. One could believe someone was lying when they were not, or one could believe their lies when they were being deceitful.

== Post-9/11 ==
The error was studied most extensively after 9/11. Many law enforcement officials were on high alert for future attacks and quick to point the finger at "suspicious-looking" individuals. The process for determining who was a potential suspect was the "Facial Action Coding System," which is a system to taxonomize human facial movements by their appearance on the face, based on a system originally developed by a Swedish anatomist named Carl-Herman Hjortsjö. It was later adopted by Paul Ekman and Wallace V. Friesen and published in 1978. However, in a situation in which not only law enforcement but also the general public are anxious and assiduous, the potential for Othello errors to creep into the real world is high. In a review of these practices by Lenese Herbert, it is stated that "invasive visual examination of faces and facial expressions for law enforcement purposes under the guise of protective administrative searches ineffectively protects national and airport security and violates reasonable expectations of privacy. FACS improperly provides unreasonable governmental activity with a legitimizing scientific imprimatur that conceals governmental agents' race- and ethnicity-based prejudices, which leads to targeting minorities' faces as portents of danger."

== Lie detectors ==
Lie detectors use questioning techniques in conjunction with technology to measure human responses to these stimuli to attempt to ascertain if that person is lying or telling the truth. The most longstanding and still most frequently used measure is the polygraph test. A polygraph, popularly referred to as a lie detector, measures and records several physiological indices such as blood pressure, pulse, respiration, and skin conductivity while the subject is asked and answers a series of questions. The polygraph is currently being used in 19 of 50 states in the US. The use of polygraph in court testimony remains controversial, and no judge can force a witness to go through with the test, although it is used extensively in post-conviction supervision, particularly of sex offenders. The reason that the test is controversial, and the reason that lie detector tests are fundamentally flawed, is the Othello error—an especially emotional, angry or distraught subject produces similar results to a supposed liar. Ekman's Telling lies has a chapter dedicated to the usage of the polygraph, in which he discusses the element of "fear" and states that "the severity of the punishment will influence the truthful person's fear of being misjudged just as much as the lying person's fear of being spotted—both suffer the same consequences."

Attempts to overcome this—such as the Matte-Quadri comparison technique that factors into the system the innocent examinee's fear of terror and quantifies the results, hence addressing physiological responses produced by that emotion—have been met with scepticism.

== Potential solutions ==
The lie catcher must make an effort to consider the possibility that a sign of an emotion is not a clue to deceit but a clue to how a truthful person feels about being suspected of lying. When analyzing the body language of another, one must ascertain if the emotion sign of emotion is a fear of being caught lying or a fear of being falsely accused and negatively judged. The lie catcher must estimate both the emotions a suspect will be feeling if they are lying but also if they are being truthful. Just as not all liars will have every possible feeling about lying, not all truthful people will have every feeling about being under suspicion.

This is difficult and requires the lie catcher to have previous background knowledge of the suspect and the emotions they convey under different types of duress. The lie catcher needs to know the emotional characteristics of the suspect so that they are aware of what emotions they convey when they are suspected of wrongdoing versus when they actually have done wrong. Not everybody is likely to feel afraid, guilty, angry, and so on when they know they are suspected of wrongdoing or lying. It depends in part upon the personality of the suspect.

== See also ==
- Cherry picking
- Confirmation bias
- Filter bubble
