= Frans H. van Eemeren =

Dutch academic

Frans Hendrik van Eemeren (born 7 April 1946, Helmond) is a Dutch scholar, professor in the Department of Speech Communication, Argumentation Theory and Rhetoric at the University of Amsterdam. He is noted for his Pragma-dialectics theory, an argumentation theory which he developed with Rob Grootendorst from the early 1980s onwards. He has published numerous books and papers, including Strategic Maneuvering in Argumentative Discourse.

== Selected works ==
- Argumentation, Communication, and Fallacies: A Pragma-Dialectical Perspective (Hillsdale: Erlbaum, 1992), with Rob Grootendorst
- Fundamentals of Argumentation Theory: A Handbook of Historical Backgrounds and Contemporary Developments (Mahwah: Erlbaum, 1996), with Rob Grootendorst
