= Logic of argumentation =

Formalised description of reasoning

The logic of argumentation (LA) is a formalised description of the ways in which humans reason and argue about propositions. It is used, for example, in computer artificial intelligence systems in the fields of medical diagnosis and prognosis, and research chemistry.

== Origin of term ==
Krause et al. appear to have been the first authors to use the term "logic of argumentation" in a paper about their model for using argumentation for qualitative reasoning under uncertainty, although the approach had been used earlier in prototype computer applications to support medical diagnosis. Their ideas have been developed further, and used in applications for predicting chemical toxicity and xenobiotic metabolism, for example.

== Implementations ==
In LA, arguments for and arguments against a proposition are distinct; an argument for a proposition contributes nothing to the case against it, and vice versa. Among other things, this means that LA can support contradiction – proof that an argument is true and that it is false. Arguments supporting the case for and arguments supporting the case against are aggregated separately, leading to a single assessment of confidence in the case for and a single assessment of confidence in the case against. Then the two are resolved to provide a single measure of confidence in the proposition.

In most implementations of LA the default aggregated value is equal to the strongest value in the set of arguments for or against the proposition. Having more than one argument in agreement does not automatically increase confidence because it cannot be assumed that the arguments are independent when reasoning under uncertainty. If there is evidence that arguments are independent and there is a case for increased confidence when they agree, this is sometimes expressed in additional rules of the form "If A and B then ...".

The process of aggregation and resolution can be represented as follows:

T = Resolve[Max{For(Ca,x, Cb,y, ...)}, Max{Against(Ca,x, Cb,y, ...)}]

where T is the overall assessment of confidence in a proposition; Resolve[] is a function which returns the single confidence value which is the resolution of any pair of values; For and Against are the sets of arguments supporting and opposing the proposition, respectively; Ca,x, Cb,y, ..., are the confidence values for those arguments; Max{...} is a function which returns the strongest member of the set upon which it operates (For or Against).

Arguments may assign confidence to propositions that themselves influence confidence in other arguments, and one rule may be undercut by another. A computer implementation can recognize these interrelationships to construct reasoning trees automatically.

== See also ==
- Argumentation framework
- Argumentation theory
- Logic and dialectic
