= Rob Grootendorst =

Dutch communication and argumentation theory scholar

Rob Grootendorst (11 February 1944, Schiedam – 23 February 2000, Amsterdam) was a Dutch communication and argumentation theory scholar. He was professor for Dutch speech communication at the University of Amsterdam. His contributions to the argumentation field include the co-foundation of the pragma-dialectic school in argumentation theory.

He also wrote several books on the life and works of the Dutch writer and politician Theo Thijssen.

== Biography ==
Grootendorst was a teacher at an elementary school in the 1960s. He studied Dutch studies at the University of Amsterdam since 1980, and became a Ph.D. in 1982 in Speech Communication. The dissertation was jointly written with Frans H. van Eemeren. They jointly founded the International Society for the Study of Argumentation in 1986.

== Selected works ==
- Argumentation, Communication, and Fallacies: A Pragma-Dialectical Perspective (Hillsdale: Erlbaum, 1992), with van Eemeren
- Fundamentals of Argumentation Theory: A Handbook of Historical Backgrounds and Contemporary Developments (Mahwah: Erlbaum, 1996), with van Eemeren
