= Stephen Toulmin =

English philosopher (1922–2009)

- Born: Stephen Edelston Toulmin; 25 March 1922; London, England
- Died: 4 December 2009 (aged 87); Los Angeles, California, U.S.

Education
- Education: King's College, Cambridge (PhD)
- Academic advisors: John Wisdom; Ludwig Wittgenstein

Philosophical work
- Era: Contemporary philosophy
- Region: Western philosophy
- School: Analytic
- Institutions: University of Oxford; University of Melbourne; University of Leeds; Brandeis University; Michigan State University; University of California, Santa Cruz; University of Chicago; Northwestern University; University of Southern California
- Doctoral students: Kurt Baier
- Main interests: Meta-philosophy, argumentation, ethics, rhetoric, modernity
- Notable ideas: Toulmin model (Toulmin method); Good reasons approach

Stephen Edelston Toulmin (/ˈtuːlmɪn/; 25 March 1922 – 4 December 2009) was a British philosopher, author, and educator. Influenced by Ludwig Wittgenstein, Toulmin devoted his works to the analysis of moral reasoning. Throughout his writings, he sought to develop practical arguments that can be used effectively in evaluating the ethics behind moral issues. His works were later found useful in the field of rhetoric, primarily for analyzing rhetorical arguments. The Toulmin model of argumentation, a diagram containing six interrelated components used for analyzing arguments, and published in his 1958 book The Uses of Argument, was considered his most influential work, particularly in the field of rhetoric and communication, and in computer science.

== Biography ==
Stephen Toulmin was born in London on 25 March 1922 to Geoffrey Edelson Toulmin and Doris Holman Toulmin. He earned his Bachelor of Arts degree from King's College, Cambridge, in 1943, where he was a Cambridge Apostle. Soon after, Toulmin was hired by the Ministry of Aircraft Production as a junior scientific officer, first at the Malvern Radar Research and Development Station and later at the Supreme Headquarters of the Allied Expeditionary Force in Germany. At the end of World War II, he returned to England to earn a Master of Arts degree in 1947 and a PhD in philosophy from Cambridge University, subsequently publishing his dissertation as An Examination of the Place of Reason in Ethics (1950). While at Cambridge, Toulmin came into contact with the Austrian philosopher Ludwig Wittgenstein, whose examination of the relationship between the uses and the meanings of language shaped much of Toulmin's own work.

After graduating from Cambridge, he was appointed University Lecturer in Philosophy of Science at Oxford University from 1949 to 1954, during which period he wrote a second book, The Philosophy of Science: an Introduction (1953). Soon after, he was appointed to the position of Visiting Professor of History and Philosophy of Science at Melbourne University in Australia from 1954 to 1955, after which he returned to England, and served as Professor and Head of the Department of Philosophy at the University of Leeds from 1955 to 1959. While at Leeds, he published one of his most influential books in the field of rhetoric, The Uses of Argument (1958), which investigated the flaws of traditional logic. Although it was poorly received in England and satirized as "Toulmin's anti-logic book" by Toulmin's fellow philosophers at Leeds, the book was applauded by the rhetoricians in the United States, where Toulmin served as a visiting professor at New York, Stanford, and Columbia Universities in 1959. While in the States, Wayne Brockriede and Douglas Ehninger introduced Toulmin's work to communication scholars, as they recognized that his work provided a good structural model useful for the analysis and criticism of rhetorical arguments. In 1960, Toulmin returned to London to hold the position of director of the Unit for History of Ideas of the Nuffield Foundation.

In 1965, Toulmin returned to the United States, where he held positions at various universities. In 1967, Toulmin served as literary executor for close friend N. R. Hanson, helping in the posthumous publication of several volumes. While at the University of California, Santa Cruz, Toulmin published Human Understanding: The Collective Use and Evolution of Concepts (1972), which examines the causes and the processes of conceptual change. In this book, Toulmin uses a novel comparison between conceptual change and Charles Darwin's model of biological evolution to analyse the process of conceptual change as an evolutionary process. The book confronts major philosophical questions as well. In 1973, while a professor in the Committee on Social Thought at the University of Chicago, he collaborated with Allan Janik, a philosophy professor at La Salle University, on the book Wittgenstein's Vienna, which advanced a thesis that underscores the significance of history to human reasoning: Contrary to philosophers who believe the absolute truth advocated in Plato's idealized formal logic, Toulmin argues that truth can be a relative quality, dependent on historical and cultural contexts (what other authors have termed "conceptual schemata").

From 1975 to 1978, he worked with the National Commission for the Protection of Human Subjects of Biomedical and Behavioral Research, established by the United States Congress. During this time, he collaborated with Albert R. Jonsen to write The Abuse of Casuistry: A History of Moral Reasoning (1988), which demonstrates the procedures for resolving moral cases. One of his most recent works, Cosmopolis: The Hidden Agenda of Modernity (1990), written while Toulmin held the position of the Avalon Foundation Professor of the Humanities at Northwestern University, specifically criticizes the practical use and the thinning morality underlying modern science.

Toulmin held distinguished professorships at a number of different universities, including Columbia, Dartmouth College, Michigan State, Northwestern, Stanford, the University of Chicago, and the University of Southern California School of International Relations.

In 1997 the National Endowment for the Humanities (NEH) selected Toulmin for the Jefferson Lecture, the U.S. federal government's highest honor for achievement in the humanities. His lecture, "A Dissenter's Story" (alternatively entitled "A Dissenter's Life"), discussed the roots of modernity in rationalism and humanism, the "contrast of the reasonable and the rational", and warned of the "abstractions that may still tempt us back into the dogmatism, chauvinism and sectarianism our needs have outgrown". The NEH report of the speech further quoted Toulmin on the need to "make the technical and the humanistic strands in modern thought work together more effectively than they have in the past".

On 2 March 2006 Toulmin received the Austrian Decoration for Science and Art.

He was married four times, once to June Goodfield, with whom he collaborated on a series of books on the history of science. His children are Greg, of McLean, Va., Polly Macinnes of Skye, Scotland, Camilla Toulmin in the UK and Matthew Toulmin of Melbourne, Australia.

On 4 December 2009 Toulmin died of a heart failure at the age of 87 in Los Angeles, California.

== Meta-philosophy ==
=== Objection to absolutism and relativism ===
Throughout many of his works, Toulmin pointed out that absolutism (represented by theoretical or analytic arguments) has limited practical value. Absolutism is derived from Plato's idealized formal logic, which advocates universal truth; accordingly, absolutists believe that moral issues can be resolved by adhering to a standard set of moral principles, regardless of context. By contrast, Toulmin contends that many of these so-called standard principles are irrelevant to real situations encountered by human beings in daily life.

To develop his contention, Toulmin introduced the concept of argument fields. In The Uses of Argument (1958), Toulmin claims that some aspects of arguments vary from field to field, and are hence called "field-dependent", while other aspects of argument are the same throughout all fields, and are hence called "field-invariant". The flaw of absolutism, Toulmin believes, lies in its unawareness of the field-dependent aspect of argument; absolutism assumes that all aspects of argument are field invariant.

In Human Understanding (1972), Toulmin suggests that anthropologists have been tempted to side with relativists because they have noticed the influence of cultural variations on rational arguments. In other words, the anthropologist or relativist overemphasizes the importance of the "field-dependent" aspect of arguments, and neglects or is unaware of the "field-invariant" elements. In order to provide solutions to the problems of absolutism and relativism, Toulmin attempts throughout his work to develop standards that are neither absolutist nor relativist for assessing the worth of ideas.

In Cosmopolis (1990), he traces philosophers' "quest for certainty" back to René Descartes and Thomas Hobbes, and lauds John Dewey, Wittgenstein, Martin Heidegger, and Richard Rorty for abandoning that tradition.

=== Humanizing modernity ===
In Cosmopolis Toulmin seeks the origins of the modern emphasis on universality (philosophers' "quest for certainty"), and criticizes both modern science and philosophers for having ignored practical issues in preference for abstract and theoretical issues. The pursuit of absolutism and theoretical arguments lacking practicality, for example, is, in his view, one of the main defects of modern philosophy. Similarly, Toulmin sensed a thinning of morality in the field of sciences, which has diverted its attention from practical issues concerning ecology to the production of the atomic bomb. To solve this problem, Toulmin advocated a return to humanism consisting of four returns: a return to oral communication and discourse, a plea which has been rejected by modern philosophers, whose scholarly focus is on the printed page; a return to the particular or individual cases that deal with practical moral issues occurring in daily life (as opposed to theoretical principles that have limited practicality); a return to the local, or to concrete cultural and historical contexts; and, finally, a return to the timely, from timeless problems to things whose rational significance depends on the time lines of our solutions. He follows up on this critique in Return to Reason (2001), where he seeks to illuminate the ills that, in his view, universalism has caused in the social sphere, discussing, among other things, the discrepancy between mainstream ethical theory and real-life ethical quandaries.

== Argumentation ==
=== Toulmin model of argument ===
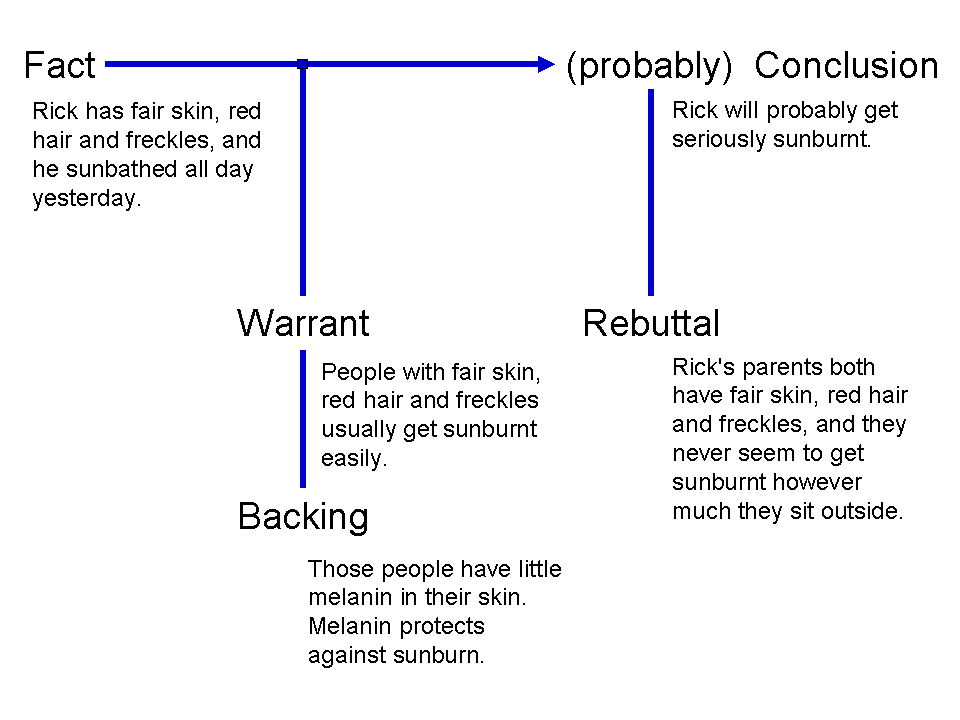
Toulmin argumentation can be diagrammed as a conclusion established, more or less, on the basis of a fact supported by a warrant (with backing), and a possible rebuttal.

Arguing that absolutism lacks practical value, Toulmin aimed to develop a different type of argument, called practical arguments (also known as substantial arguments). In contrast to absolutists' theoretical arguments, Toulmin's practical argument is intended to focus on the justificatory function of argumentation, as opposed to the inferential function of theoretical arguments. Whereas theoretical arguments make inferences based on a set of principles to arrive at a claim, practical arguments first find a claim of interest, and then provide justification for it. Toulmin believed that reasoning is less an activity of inference, involving the discovering of new ideas, and more a process of testing and sifting already existing ideas—an act achievable through the process of justification.

Toulmin believed that for a good argument to succeed, it needs to provide good justification for a claim. This, he believed, will ensure it stands up to criticism and earns a favourable verdict. In The Uses of Argument (1958), Toulmin proposed a layout containing six interrelated components for analyzing arguments:

Claim (Conclusion)
A conclusion whose merit must be established. In argumentative essays, it may be called the thesis. For example, if a person tries to convince a listener that he is a British citizen, the claim would be "I am a British citizen" (1).

Ground (Fact, Evidence, Data)
A fact one appeals to as a foundation for the claim. For example, the person introduced in 1 can support his claim with the supporting data "I was born in Bermuda" (2).

Warrant
A statement authorizing movement from the ground to the claim. In order to move from the ground established in 2, "I was born in Bermuda", to the claim in 1, "I am a British citizen", the person must supply a warrant to bridge the gap between 1 and 2 with the statement "A man born in Bermuda will legally be a British citizen" (3).

Backing
Credentials designed to certify the statement expressed in the warrant; backing must be introduced when the warrant itself is not convincing enough to the readers or the listeners. For example, if the listener does not deem the warrant in 3 as credible, the speaker will supply the legal provisions: "I trained as a barrister in London, specialising in citizenship, so I know that a man born in Bermuda will legally be a British citizen".

Rebuttal (Reservation)
Statements recognizing the restrictions which may legitimately be applied to the claim. It is exemplified as follows: "A man born in Bermuda will legally be a British citizen, unless he has betrayed Britain and has become a spy for another country".

Qualifier
Words or phrases expressing the speaker's degree of force or certainty concerning the claim. Such words or phrases include "probably", "possible", "impossible", "certainly", "presumably", "as far as the evidence goes", and "necessarily". The claim "I am definitely a British citizen" has a greater degree of force than the claim "I am a British citizen, presumably". (See also: Defeasible reasoning.)

The first three elements, claim, ground, and warrant, are considered as the essential components of practical arguments, while the second triad, qualifier, backing, and rebuttal, may not be needed in some arguments.

When Toulmin first proposed it, this layout of argumentation was based on legal arguments and intended to be used to analyze the rationality of arguments typically found in the courtroom. Toulmin did not realize that this layout could be applicable to the field of rhetoric and communication until his works were introduced to rhetoricians by Wayne Brockriede and Douglas Ehninger. Their Decision by Debate (1963) streamlined Toulmin's terminology and broadly introduced his model to the field of debate. Only after Toulmin published Introduction to Reasoning (1979) were the rhetorical applications of this layout mentioned in his works.

One criticism of the Toulmin model is that it does not fully consider the use of questions in argumentation. The Toulmin model assumes that an argument starts with a fact or claim and ends with a conclusion, but ignores an argument's underlying questions. In the example "Harry was born in Bermuda, so Harry must be a British subject", the question "Is Harry a British subject?" is ignored, which also neglects to analyze why particular questions are asked and others are not. (See Issue mapping for an example of an argument-mapping method that emphasizes questions.)

Toulmin's argument model has inspired research on, for example, goal structuring notation (GSN), widely used for developing safety cases, and argument maps and associated software.

== Ethics ==
=== Good reasons approach ===
In Reason in Ethics (1950), his doctoral dissertation, Toulmin sets out a Good Reasons approach of ethics, and criticizes what he considers to be the subjectivism and emotivism of philosophers such as A. J. Ayer because, in his view, they fail to do justice to ethical reasoning.

=== Revival of casuistry ===
By reviving casuistry (also known as case ethics), Toulmin sought to find the middle ground between the extremes of absolutism and relativism. Casuistry was practiced widely during the Middle Ages and the Renaissance to resolve moral issues. Although casuistry largely fell silent during the modern period, in The Abuse of Casuistry: A History of Moral Reasoning (1988), Toulmin collaborated with Albert R. Jonsen to demonstrate the effectiveness of casuistry in practical argumentation during the Middle Ages and the Renaissance, effectively reviving it as a permissible method of argument.

Casuistry employs absolutist principles, called "type cases" or "paradigm cases", without resorting to absolutism. It uses the standard principles (for example, sanctity of life) as referential markers in moral arguments. An individual case is then compared and contrasted with the type case. Given an individual case that is completely identical to the type case, moral judgments can be made immediately using the standard moral principles advocated in the type case. If the individual case differs from the type case, the differences will be critically assessed in order to arrive at a rational claim.

Through the procedure of casuistry, Toulmin and Jonsen identified three problematic situations in moral reasoning: first, the type case fits the individual case only ambiguously; second, two type cases apply to the same individual case in conflicting ways; third, an unprecedented individual case occurs, which cannot be compared or contrasted to any type case. Through the use of casuistry, Toulmin demonstrated and reinforced his previous emphasis on the significance of comparison to moral arguments, a significance not addressed in theories of absolutism or relativism.

== Philosophy of science ==
=== Evolutionary model ===
In 1972, Toulmin published Human Understanding, in which he asserts that conceptual change is an evolutionary process. In this book, Toulmin attacks Thomas Kuhn's account of conceptual change in his seminal work The Structure of Scientific Revolutions (1962). Kuhn believed that conceptual change is a revolutionary process (as opposed to an evolutionary process), during which mutually exclusive paradigms compete to replace one another. Toulmin criticized the relativist elements in Kuhn's thesis, arguing that mutually exclusive paradigms provide no ground for comparison, and that Kuhn made the relativists' error of overemphasizing the "field variant" while ignoring the "field invariant" or commonality shared by all argumentation or scientific paradigms.

In contrast to Kuhn's revolutionary model, Toulmin proposed an evolutionary model of conceptual change comparable to Darwin's model of biological evolution. Toulmin states that conceptual change involves the process of innovation and selection. Innovation accounts for the appearance of conceptual variations, while selection accounts for the survival and perpetuation of the soundest conceptions. Innovation occurs when the professionals of a particular discipline come to view things differently from their predecessors; selection subjects the innovative concepts to a process of debate and inquiry in what Toulmin considers as a "forum of competitions". The soundest concepts will survive the forum of competition as replacements or revisions of the traditional conceptions.

From the absolutists' point of view, concepts are either valid or invalid regardless of contexts. From the relativists' perspective, one concept is neither better nor worse than a rival concept from a different cultural context. From Toulmin's perspective, the evaluation depends on a process of comparison, which determines whether or not one concept will improve explanatory power more than its rival concepts.

== Pantheon of skeptics ==
At a meeting of the executive council of the Committee for Skeptical Inquiry (CSI) in Denver, Colorado, in April 2011, Toulmin was selected for inclusion in CSI's Pantheon of Skeptics. The Pantheon of Skeptics was created by CSI to remember the legacy of deceased fellows of CSI and their contributions to the cause of scientific skepticism.

== Works ==
- An Examination of the Place of Reason in Ethics (1950) ISBN 0-226-80843-2
- The Philosophy of Science: An Introduction (1953)
- The Uses of Argument (1958) 2nd edition 2003: ISBN 0-521-53483-6
- Metaphysical Beliefs, Three Essays (1957) with Ronald W. Hepburn and Alasdair MacIntyre
- The Riviera (1961)
- Seventeenth century science and the arts (1961)
- Foresight and Understanding: An Enquiry into the Aims of Science (1961) ISBN 0-313-23345-4
- The Fabric of the Heavens (The Ancestry of Science, volume 1) (1961) with June Goodfield ISBN 0-226-80848-3
- The Architecture of Matter (The Ancestry of Science, volume 2) (1962) with June Goodfield ISBN 0-226-80840-8
- Night Sky at Rhodes (1963)
- The Discovery of Time (The Ancestry of Science, volume 3) (1965) with June Goodfield ISBN 0-226-80842-4
- Physical Reality (1970)
- Human Understanding: The Collective Use and Evolution of Concepts (1972) ISBN 0-691-01996-7
- Wittgenstein's Vienna (1973) with Allan Janik
- On the Nature of the Physician's Understanding (1976)
- Knowing and Acting: An Invitation to Philosophy (1976) ISBN 0-02-421020-X
- An Introduction to Reasoning with Allan Janik and Richard D. Rieke (1979), 2nd ed. 1984; 3rd edition 1997: ISBN 0-02-421160-5
- The Return to Cosmology: Postmodern Science and the Theology of Nature (1985) ISBN 0-520-05465-2
- The Abuse of Casuistry: A History of Moral Reasoning (1988) with Albert R. Jonsen ISBN 0-520-06960-9
- Cosmopolis: The Hidden Agenda of Modernity (1990) ISBN 0-226-80838-6
- Social Impact of AIDS in the United States (1993) with Albert R. Jonsen
- Beyond theory – changing organizations through participation (1996) with Björn Gustavsen (editors)
- Return to Reason (2001) ISBN 0-674-01235-6

== See also ==
- Argumentation theory
- Cambridge University Moral Sciences Club
