= Pars destruens and pars construens =

Complementary parts of argumentation

Pars destruens and pars construens (Latin) are complementary parts of argumentation. The negative part of criticizing views is the pars destruens. And the positive part of stating one's own position and arguments is the pars construens.

The distinction goes back to Francis Bacon and his work Novum Organum (1620). There he puts forth his inductive method that has two parts: a negative part, pars destruens, that removes all prejudices and errors; and the positive part, pars construens, that is about gaining knowledge and truth.
