= Probabilistic argumentation =

Probabilistic argumentation refers to different formal frameworks pertaining to probabilistic logic. All share the idea that qualitative aspects can be captured by an underlying logic, while quantitative aspects of uncertainty can be accounted for by probabilistic measures.

== Probabilistic argumentation labellings ==
The framework of "probabilistic labellings" refers to probability spaces where the sample space is a set of labellings of argumentation graphs (Riveret et al. 2018). A labelling of an argumentation graph associates any argument of the graph with a label to reflect the acceptability of the argument within the graph. For example, an argument can be associated with a label "in" (the argument is accepted), "out" (the argument is rejected), or "und" (the status of the argument is undecided — neither accepted nor rejected). Consequently, the approach of probabilistic labellings associates any argument with the probability of a label to reflect the probability of the argument to be labelled as such.

== Probabilistic argumentation systems ==
The name "probabilistic argumentation" has been used to refer to a particular theory of reasoning that encompasses uncertainty and ignorance, combining probability theory and deductive logic (Haenni, Kohlas & Lehmann 2000). OpenPAS is an open-source implementation of such a probabilistic argumentation system.

Probabilistic argumentation systems encounter a problem when used to determine the occurrence of Black Swan events since, by definition, those events are so improbable as to seem impossible. As such, probabilistic arguments should be considered fallacious arguments known as appeals to probability.
