= Communication Monographs =

- Discipline: Communication studies
- Language: English

Publication details
- Former name: Speech Monographs (1934 - 1975)
- History: 1934-present
- Publisher: Taylor & Francis on behalf of the National Communication Association
- Frequency: Quarterly

Standard abbreviations
- ISO 4: Commun. Monogr.

Indexing
- ISSN: 0363-7751 (print); 1479-5787 (web)
- LCCN: 76646796
- OCLC no.: 2313630

Links
- Journal homepage

Communication Monographs is a quarterly peer-reviewed academic journal covering research on human communication. The journal is published by Taylor & Francis on behalf of the National Communication Association. Communication Monographs publishes original scholarship that contributes to the understanding of human communication.

Articles in Communication Monographs should endeavor to ask questions about the diverse and complex issues that interest communication scholars.

The journal especially welcomes questions that bridge boundaries traditionally separating scholars within the communication discipline and that address issues of clear theoretical, conceptual, methodological, and/or social importance.

Diverse approaches to addressing and answering these questions, including theoretical argument, quantitative and qualitative empirical research, and rhetorical and textual analysis, as well as acknowledgement of the often tentative and partial nature of any answers, are welcomed. Approaches to answering questions should be clearly relevant to the questions asked, rigorous in terms of both argument and method, cognizant of alternative interpretations, and contextualized within the wider body of communication scholarship.

== Abstracting and indexing ==
The journal is abstracted and indexed in

- America: History and Life
- Communication Abstracts
- Communication and Mass Media Complete
- Current Abstracts
- Current Contents/Social & Behavioral Sciences
- Education Index
- Education Research Index
- Electronic Collections Online
- Expanded Academic Index
- Film Literature Index
- Historical Abstracts
- Linguistics and Language Behavior Abstracts
- MLA Directory of Periodicals
- MLA International Bibliography
- OCLC
- Periodicals Index Online
- PsycINFO
- SafetyLit
- Social Sciences Citation Index
- Scopus
- Social Services Abstracts
- Sociological Abstracts
