= Walter Carnielli =

Brazilian logician

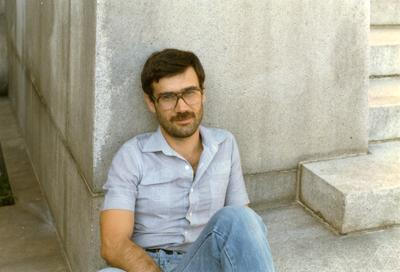
Walter Carnielli in Berkeley in 1984

Walter Alexandre Carnielli (born 11 January 1952 in Campinas, Brazil) is a Brazilian mathematician, logician, and philosopher, who works as a full professor of Logic at the State University of Campinas. After obtaining his Bachelor and M.Sc. degrees in mathematics at the State University of Campinas, he also obtained his Ph.D. in 1984 there under the supervision of Newton da Costa; subsequently, he worked as a post-doc at the University of California at Berkeley, following an invitation by Leon Henkin.

== Areas of interest ==
=== Many-valued logic and paraconsistent logic ===
Carnielli contributed to the proof theory and semantics of many-valued logics and paraconsistent logics. His tableau method for many-valued logics generalized all previous treatments of the subject. His proposal of the possible-translations semantics (a new semantical interpretation for paraconsistent logics) contributed to a revival in the philosophical interpretation of paraconsistent logics.

The logics of formal inconsistency, which systematize a large class of paraconsistent logics, opened the way to the application of paraconsistency to computer science and to new philosophical investigations on paraconsistency.

=== Combinatorics, modulated logics, and combinations of logics ===
He also published on finite and infinite combinatorics, and developed (with his collaborators A. M. Sette and P. A. Veloso) the modulated logics, a new kind of logics that allows the formalization of qualitative reasoning by means of special generalized quantifiers. His research also includes model theory, non-classical logics, foundations of quantum computation, and combinations of logics.

== Positions and awards ==
Carnielli served as a Director for the Centre for Logic, Epistemology and the History of Science at UNICAMP for three terms, and served as President of the Brazilian Logic Society. He was distinguished with an Alexander von Humboldt grant for long-term research stays in Germany, and served as en editor and/or a member of editorial boards of major journals, such as Studia Logica, Logic and Logical Philosophy, Journal of Applied Logic, CLE e-Prints, Reports on Mathematical Logic and Journal of Applied Non Classical Logics. He received the Telesio-Galilei Gold Medal Award in Philosophy and Mathematics in 2012.

== Selected publications ==
=== Articles ===
- W. A. Carnielli. On coloring and covering problems for rook domains, Discrete Mathematics 57 (1985), pp. 9–16.
- W. A. Carnielli. Systematization of the finite many-valued logics through the method of tableaux. The Journal of Symbolic Logic 52 (2), 1987, pp. 73–493.
- W. A. Carnielli (with Newton C. A. da Costa). Paraconsistent deontic logics. Philosophia – The Philos. Quarterly of Israel vol.16 numbers 3 and 4 (1988), pp. 293–305.
- W. A. Carnielli. Hyper-rook domain inequalities. Studies in Applied Mathematics (Massachusetts Institute of Technology) 82,\ n.1 (1990), pp. 59–69.
- W. A. Carnielli (with C. A. Di Prisco). Some results on polarized partition relations of higher dimension. Mathematical Logic Quarterly 39 (1993) pp. 461–474.
- W. A. Carnielli (with P. A. S. Veloso). Ultrafilter logic and generic reasoning. In Computational Logic and Proof Theory (Vienna, 1997), pp. 34–53, Lecture Notes in Computer. Science 1289, Springer, Berlin, 1997.
- W. A. Carnielli. Possible-translations semantics for paraconsistent logics. In: Frontiers in Paraconsistent Logic: Proceedings of the I World Congress on Paraconsistency, Ghent, 1998, pp. 159–72, edited by D. Batens et al., Kings College Publications, 2000.
- W. A. Carnielli (with E. L. Monte Carmelo). K2,2-K1,n and K2,n-K2,n bipartite Ramsey numbers. Discrete Mathematics, Vol. 223 (1-3), 2000, pp. 83–92.
- W. A. Carnielli (with C. Sernadas and J. Rasga). Modulated fibring and the collapsing problem. The Journal of Symbolic Logic 67(4) 2002 pp. 1541–1569.
- W. A. Carnielli (with J. Marcos). A taxonomy of C- systems . In: Paraconsistency- the Logical Way to the Inconsistent, Lecture Notes in Pure and Applied Mathematics, Vol. 228, pp. 01–94 2002.
- W. A. Carnielli (with C. Caleiro, M. E. Coniglio and J. Marcos). Two’s company: The humbug of many logical values. In: Logica Universalis (Editor J.-Y. Béziau). Basel: Birkhäuser, 2005, p. 169-189.
- W. A. Carnielli (with A. B.M. Brunner).Anti-intuitionism and paraconsistency. Journal of Applied Logic Volume 3, Issue 1, March 2005, pages 161-184.
- W. A. Carnielli (with M. E. Coniglio). Splitting Logics. In: We Will Show Them: Essays in Honour of Dov Gabbay. (Editors S. Artemov, H. Barringer, A. S. Avila Garcez, L. C. Lamb and J. Woods). London: King’s College Publications, 2005, v. 1, p. 389-414.
- W. A. Carnielli (with M. E. Coniglio and J. Marcos). Logics of Formal Inconsistency. In: Handbook of Philosophical Logic, vol. 14, pp. 15–107. Eds.: D. Gabbay; F. Guenthner. Springer, 2007.
- W. A. Carnielli (with M. E. Coniglio. Combining Logics. Stanford Encyclopedia of Philosophy, 2007.
- W. A. Carnielli (with J. Rasga and C. Sernadas). Preservation of Interpolation Features by Fibring. Mathematical Logic Quarterly Volume 18, Issue 1, 2008, pages

123-151.

- W. A. Carnielli (with J. Rasga and C. Sernadas). Interpolation via translations. Mathematical Logic Quarterly Volume 55, Issue 5, 2009, pages 515-534.
- W. A. Carnielli (with J. C. Agudelo). Paraconsistent Machines and their Relation to Quantum Computing.. Journal of Logic and Computation Volume 20, Issue 2, 2010, pages 573-595.

=== Books ===
- R. L. Epstein and W. A. Carnielli. Computability: computable functions, logic and the foundations of mathematics, with the timeline Computability and Undecidability. Second edition. Wadsworth/Thomson Learning, Belmont, CA, 2000.
- W. A. Carnielli and C. Pizzi. Modalità e multimodalità. Franco Angeli, Milan, 2001.
- W. A. Carnielli and R.L. Epstein Computabilidade: Funções Computáveis, Lógica e os Fundamentos da Matemática Winner of 2007 Jabuti Award, a prestigious literary prize in Brazil.
- W. A. Carnielli and C. Pizzi. Modalities and Multimodalities. Springer-Verlag), 2008.
- W. A. Carnielli, M. E. Coniglio, D. Gabbay, P. Gouveia and C. Sernadas. Analysis and Synthesis of Logics. How to Cut and Paste Reasoning Systems. Applied Logic Series, Springer, 2008.
