= Cristina Sernadas =

Portuguese logician (born 1951)

Maria Cristina De Sales Viana Serôdio Sernadas (born 1951) is a Portuguese mathematical logician whose research topics have included object-oriented specification languages and logics for information systems, and the use of category theory in the combination ("fibring") of multiple types of logic. She is Professor for Logic and Computation in the Department of Mathematics of the Technical University of Lisbon.

== Education and career ==
Sernadas studied mathematics at the University of Lisbon, graduating in 1973, and earned a Ph.D. in mathematics in 1980 from the University of London. Her doctoral dissertation, Multivariate Branching Processes, concerned branching processes in probability theory, and was supervised by statistician D. J. Bartholomew.

In 1988 she completed a habilitation (agregação) at the Technical University of Lisbon, and became a full professor there in 1993.

== Books ==
Sernadas's books include:

- Introdução à Teoria da Computação (Introduction to the Theory of Computing, Editorial Presença, 1993)
- Introdução à Programação em Mathematica (Introduction to Programming in Mathematica, with J. Carmo, A. Sernadas, F. M. Dionísio, and C. Caleiro, IST Press, 1999; 2nd ed., 2004; 3rd ed., 2014)
- Foundations of Logic and Theory of Computation (with A. Sernadas, College Publications, 2008; 2nd ed., 2012)
- Analysis and Synthesis of Logics: How To Cut And Paste Reasoning Systems (with W. A. Carnielli, M. E. Coniglio, D. Gabbay, and P. Gouveia, Springer, 2008)
- A Mathematical Primer on Computability (with A. Sernadas, J. Rasga and J. Ramos, College Publications, 2018)
- A Mathematical Primer on Linear Optimization (with D. Gomes, A. Sernadas, J. Rasga and P. Mateus, College Publications, 2019)
- Decidability of Logical Theories and Their Combination (with J. Rasga, Springer, 2020)
