= Logical form =

Precisely specified semantic version of a statement

In logic, the logical form of a statement is a precisely specified semantic version of that statement in a formal system. Informally, the logical form attempts to formalize a possibly ambiguous statement into a statement with a precise, unambiguous logical interpretation with respect to a formal system. In an ideal formal language, the meaning of a logical form can be determined unambiguously from syntax alone. Logical forms are semantic, not syntactic constructs; therefore, there may be more than one string that represents the same logical form in a given language.

The logical form of an argument is called the argument form of the argument.

== History ==
The importance of the concept of form to logic was already recognized in ancient times. Aristotle, in the Prior Analytics, was one of the first people to employ variable letters to represent valid inferences. Therefore, Jan Łukasiewicz claims that the introduction of variables was "one of Aristotle's greatest inventions."

According to the followers of Aristotle like Ammonius, only the logical principles stated in schematic terms belong to logic, and not those given in concrete terms. The concrete terms man, mortal, and so forth are analogous to the substitution values of the schematic placeholders A, B, C, which were called the "matter" (Greek hyle, Latin materia) of the argument.

The term "logical form" itself was introduced by Bertrand Russell in 1914, in the context of his program to formalize natural language and reasoning, which he called philosophical logic. Russell wrote: "Some kind of knowledge of logical forms, though with most people it is not explicit, is involved in all understanding of discourse. It is the business of philosophical logic to extract this knowledge from its concrete integuments, and to render it explicit and pure."

== Example of argument form ==
To demonstrate the important notion of the form of an argument, substitute letters for similar items throughout the sentences in the original argument.

Original argument
All humans are mortal.
Socrates is human.
Therefore, Socrates is mortal.

Argument form
All H are M.
S is H.
Therefore, S is M.

All that has been done in the argument form is to put H for human and humans, M for mortal, and S for Socrates. What results is the form of the original argument. Moreover, each individual sentence of the argument form is the sentence form of its respective sentence in the original argument.

== Importance of argument form ==
Attention is given to argument and sentence form, because form is what makes an argument valid or cogent. All logical form arguments are either inductive or deductive. Inductive logical forms include inductive generalization, statistical arguments, causal argument, and arguments from analogy. Common deductive argument forms are hypothetical syllogism, categorical syllogism, argument by definition, argument based on mathematics, argument from definition. The most reliable forms of logic are modus ponens, modus tollens, and chain arguments because if the premises of the argument are true, then the conclusion necessarily follows. Two invalid argument forms are affirming the consequent and denying the antecedent.

Affirming the consequent
All dogs are animals.
Coco is an animal.
Therefore, Coco is a dog.

Denying the antecedent
All cats are animals.
Missy is not a cat.
Therefore, Missy is not an animal.

A logical argument, seen as an ordered set of sentences, has a logical form that derives from the form of its constituent sentences; the logical form of an argument is sometimes called argument form. Some authors only define logical form with respect to whole arguments, as the schemata or inferential structure of the argument. In argumentation theory or informal logic, an argument form is sometimes seen as a broader notion than the logical form.

It consists of stripping out all spurious grammatical features from the sentence (such as gender, and passive forms), and replacing all the expressions specific to the subject matter of the argument by schematic variables. Thus, for example, the expression "all A's are B's" shows the logical form which is common to the sentences "all men are mortals", "all cats are carnivores", "all Greeks are philosophers", and so on.

== Logical form in modern logic ==
The fundamental difference between modern formal logic and traditional, or Aristotelian logic, lies in their differing analysis of the logical form of the sentences they treat:

- On the traditional view, the form of the sentence consists of (1) a subject (e.g., "man") plus a sign of quantity ("all" or "some" or "no"); (2) the copula, which is of the form "is" or "is not"; (3) a predicate (e.g., "mortal"). Thus: "all men are mortal." The logical constants such as "all", "no", and so on, plus sentential connectives such as "and" and "or", were called syncategorematic terms (from the Greek kategorei – to predicate, and syn – together with). This is a fixed scheme, where each judgment has a specific quantity and copula, determining the logical form of the sentence.
- The modern view is more complex, since a single judgement of Aristotle's system involves two or more logical connectives. For example, the sentence "All men are mortal" involves, in term logic, two non-logical terms "is a man" (here M) and "is mortal" (here D): the sentence is given by the judgement A(M,D). In predicate logic, the sentence involves the same two non-logical concepts, here analyzed as $m(x)$ and $d(x)$, and the sentence is given by $\forall x (m(x) \rightarrow d(x))$, involving the logical connectives for universal quantification and implication.

The more complex modern view comes with more power. On the modern view, the fundamental form of a simple sentence is given by a recursive schema, like natural language and involving logical connectives, which are joined by juxtaposition to other sentences, which in turn may have logical structure. Medieval logicians recognized the problem of multiple generality, where Aristotelian logic is unable to satisfactorily render such sentences as "some guys have all the luck", because both quantities "all" and "some" may be relevant in an inference, but the fixed scheme that Aristotle used allows only one to govern the inference. Just as linguists recognize recursive structure in natural languages, it appears that logic needs recursive structure.

== Logical forms in natural language processing ==
In semantic parsing, statements in natural languages are converted into logical forms that represent their meanings.

== See also ==
- Argument map – Visual representation of the structure of an argument
- Logical fallacy – Faulty deductive reasoning due to a logical flaw
- Informal fallacy – Form of incorrect argument in natural language
- Categorial grammar – Family of formalisms in natural language syntax
- Sense and reference – Distinction in the philosophy of language
- Analytic–synthetic distinction – Semantic distinction in philosophy
- Semantic argument
- List of valid argument forms
