= List of valid argument forms =

Of the many and varied argument forms that can possibly be constructed, only very few are valid argument forms. In order to evaluate these forms, statements are put into logical form. Logical form replaces any sentences or ideas with letters to remove any bias from content and allow one to evaluate the argument without any bias due to its subject matter.

Being a valid argument does not necessarily mean the conclusion will be true. It is valid because if the premises are true, then the conclusion has to be true. This can be proven for any valid argument form using a truth table which shows that there is no situation in which there are all true premises and a false conclusion.

== Valid syllogistic forms ==
In syllogistic logic, there are 256 possible ways to construct categorical syllogisms using the A, E, I, and O statement forms in the square of opposition. Of the 256, only 24 are valid forms. Of the 24 valid forms, 15 are unconditionally valid, and 9 are conditionally valid.

=== Unconditionally valid ===
Figure 1	Figure 2	Figure 3	Figure 4
AAA; EAE; AII; EIO	AEE; EAE; EIO; AOO	AII; IAI; OAO; EIO	AEE; IAI; EIO

=== Conditionally valid ===
Figure 1	Figure 2	Figure 3	Figure 4	Required condition
AAI; EAO	AEO; EAO		AEO	Minor term exists
		AAI; EAO	EAO	Middle term exists
			AAI	Major term exists

== Valid propositional forms ==
The following is a list of some common valid argument forms in propositional logic. It is nowhere near exhaustive, and gives only a few examples of the better known valid argument forms.

=== Modus ponens ===
One valid argument form is known as modus ponens, not to be mistaken with modus tollens, which is another valid argument form that has a like-sounding name and structure. Modus ponens (sometimes abbreviated as MP) says that if one thing is true, then another will be. It then states that the first is true. The conclusion is that the second thing is true. It is shown below in logical form.

If A, then B
A
Therefore B

Before being put into logical form the above statement could have been something like below.

If Kelly does not finish his homework, he will not go to class
Kelly did not finish his homework
Therefore, Kelly will not go to class

The first two statements are the premises while the third is the conclusion derived from them.

=== Modus tollens ===
Another form of argument is known as modus tollens (commonly abbreviated MT). In this form, you start with the same first premise as with modus ponens. However, the second part of the premise is denied, leading to the conclusion that the first part of the premise should be denied as well. It is shown below in logical form.

If A, then B
Not B
Therefore not A.

When modus tollens is used with actual content, it looks like below.

If the Saints win the Super Bowl, there will be a party in New Orleans that night
There was no party in New Orleans that night
Therefore, the Saints did not win the Super Bowl

=== Hypothetical syllogism ===
Much like modus ponens and modus tollens, hypothetical syllogism (sometimes abbreviated as HS) contains two premises and a conclusion. It is, however, slightly more complicated than the first two. In short, it states that if one thing happens, another will as well. If that second thing happens, a third will follow it. Therefore, if the first thing happens, it is inevitable that the third will too. It is shown below in logical form.

If A, then B
If B, then C
Therefore if A, then C

When put into words it looks like below.

If it rains today, I will wear my rain jacket
If I wear my rain jacket, I will keep dry
Therefore if it rains today, I will keep dry

=== Disjunctive syllogism ===
Disjunctive syllogism (sometimes abbreviated DS) has one of the same characteristics as modus tollens in that it contains a premise, then in a second premise it denies a statement, leading to the conclusion. In Disjunctive Syllogism, the first premise establishes two options. The second takes one away, so the conclusion states that the remaining one must be true. It is shown below in logical form.

Either A or B
Not A
Therefore B

When A and B are replaced with real life examples it looks like below.

Either you will see Joe in class today or he will oversleep
You did not see Joe in class today
Therefore Joe overslept

Disjunctive syllogism takes two options and narrows it down to one.

=== Constructive dilemma ===
Another valid form of argument is known as constructive dilemma or sometimes just 'dilemma'. It does not leave the user with one statement alone at the end of the argument, instead, it gives an option of two different statements. The first premise gives an option of two different statements. Then it states that if the first one happens, there will be a particular outcome and if the second happens, there will be a separate outcome. The conclusion is that either the first outcome or the second outcome will happen. The criticism with this form is that it does not give a definitive conclusion; just a statement of possibilities. When it is written in argument form it looks like below.

Either A or B
If A then C
If B then D
Therefore either C or D

When content is inserted in place of the letters, it looks like below.

Bill will either take the stairs or the elevator to his room
If he takes the stairs, he will be tired when he gets to his room
If he takes the elevator, he will miss the start of the football game on TV
Therefore Bill will either be tired when he gets to his room or he will miss the start of the football game

There is a slightly different version of dilemma that uses negation rather than affirming something known as destructive dilemma. When put in argumentative form it looks like below.

If A then C
If B then D
Not C or not D
Therefore not A or not B

== See also ==
- Semantic argument
