= Semantic argument =

Type of argument

Semantic argument is a type of argument in which one fixes the meaning of a term in order to support their argument. Semantic arguments are commonly used in public, political, academic, legal or religious discourse. Most commonly such semantic modification are being introduced through persuasive definitions, but there are also other ways of modifying meaning (like attribution or classification). There are many subtypes of semantic arguments such as: no true Scotsman arguments, arguments from verbal classification, arguments from definition or arguments to definition.

== Structure ==
Since there are various types of semantic arguments, there are also various argumentation schemes to this argument. The term of semantic argument was introduced by Teresa Hołówka in 1990, and later developed by Jakub Prus and other logicians. There are three most basic types of semantic arguments, which have different argumentation schemes, but all modify meaning to support persuasion: argument from definition, argument to definition (as distinguished by Peter of Spain: definitio-definitum and definitum-definitio), and classification argument.

=== Argument to definition ===
Arguments to definition are aimed to include certain objects into the extension of given definition – sometimes this might be the end of reasoning ("this is racism"). Obviously, the semantic modification is being introduced through persuasive definition in definition premise.

- Individual Premise: A possesses some property F.
- Definition Premise: For all x, if possesses some property F, then x fits definition D.
- Conclusion: A fits definition D.

=== Argument from definition ===
Sometimes the argument can start from definition and to include certain property in it, in order to attribute this property to certain object ("All forms of racism should be prosecuted, therefore this given action also should be prosecuted"). Arguments to definition and from definition can be used together (Douglas Walton called the latter Arguments from Definition to Verbal Classification").

- Definition Premise: A fits definition D.
- Classificatory Premise: For all x, if x fits definition D, then x is classified as having the property G.
- Conclusion: A has the property G.

=== Argument from verbal classification ===
Persuasive definitions are not the only way of modifying meaning – one may also modify meaning simply by linking two properties together (Douglas Walton calls it a "Verbal Classification"), and then attribute a new property to given object ("if something is prosecuted, then it is morally wrong, therefore racism is morally wrong").

- Individual Premise: A possesses some property F.
- Classificatory Premise: For all x, if x possesses property F, then x can be classified as possessing property G.
- Conclusion: A possesses property G.

These are three most common types of semantic arguments. Full typology of semantic arguments includes classification of persuasive definitions (the notion coined by Charles Stevenson) developed by Tadeusz Pawlowski. It also includes classification arguments (also called "attributive arguments").

In order to assess semantic argument one need to assess semantic modification made in it first. The criteria for assessing such modifications are: transparency of modification, coherence with usage, consequences of modification, authority of modifying party, alternative meanings. Also the individual premise (which attributes the key property to the given object) needs to be evaluated, since sometimes it is the most vulnerable piece of argument.

== Examples of semantic arguments ==
1. Bribery is about giving somebody something of significant value to make him do something we want. My client just wanted to avoid being called from one police office to another, so he gave the policeman five euros. Let’s be serious—you cannot classify this as ‘bribery’, can you?
2. Democracy is the policy of government that tries to bring morality and politics closer to one another until they coincide.
3. Democracy is the form of government which gives, or tries to give, the people the illusion of their own sovereignty. [F. Macagno & D. Walton's example]
4. Terrorists are bandits who hide behind political, religious or nationalist slogans to try to resolve questions that have nothing to do with what they publicly state [F. Macagno's & D. Walton's example].
5. A legal rule forbids you to take a vehicle into the public park. Plainly this forbids an automobile, but what about bicycles, roller skates, toy automobiles? What about airplanes? Are these, as we say, to be called ‘vehicles’ for the purpose of the rule or not? [H.L.A.Hart's example].

== See also ==
- Essentially contested concept
- Leviathan (Hobbes book)
- Spinoza's Ethics
