= Leon van der Torre =

Dutch professor of computer science

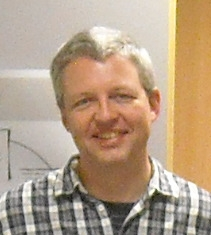
- Born: Leendert van der Torre; 18 March 1968 (age 58); Rotterdam, Netherlands
- Education: Erasmus University Rotterdam
- Known for: BOID agent architecture; input/output logics; game-theoretic approach to normative multiagent systems
- Awards: ECCAI Fellow (2015)
- Scientific career
- Fields: deontic logic, artificial intelligence, multi-agent systems
- Workplaces: University of Luxembourg
- Thesis: Reasoning about obligations: defeasibility in preference-based deontic logic (1997)
- Doctoral advisor: Yao-Hua Tan
- Doctoral students: Marija Slavkovik

Leendert (Leon) van der Torre is a professor of computer science at the University of Luxembourg and head of the Individual and Collective Reasoning (ICR) group, part of the Computer Science and Communication (CSC) Research Unit. Leon van der Torre is a prolific researcher in deontic logic and multi-agent systems, a member of the Ethics Advisory Committee of the University of Luxembourg and founder of the CSC Robotic research laboratory. Since March 2016 he is the head of the Computer Science and Communication (CSC) Research Unit.

== Biography ==
Leon van der Torre was born on March 18, 1968, in Rotterdam, the Netherlands. He lived in Zevenhuizen, where he attended primary school, before he later attended the secondary school division VWO of the Orange-Nassau College in Zoetermeer. During that time he bought his first computer, a ZX-81, which he programmed himself, and liked to write articles for a computer magazine. He also became national youth champion in the game of bridge.

Leon van der Torre studied computer science at the Erasmus University Rotterdam at the Faculty of Economics, and also pursued studies in philosophy. He held positions at EURIDIS and the Department of Computer Science during which he obtained his Master of Science (1992) and his PhD in computer science (1997) with Yao-Hua Tan. His thesis was concerned with deontic logic in computer science and its combination with nonmonotonic logic. His main research topic are logics in Artificial Intelligence and computer science.

After positions in Germany (Max Planck Institute for Informatics in Saarbrücken), France (Marie Curie fellow, CNRS-IRIT, Toulouse), and the Netherlands (CWI Amsterdam, Vrije Universiteit), he joined the University of Luxembourg as a full professor for Intelligent Systems in January 2006. Currently, he is also the head of the Computer Science and Communication Research Unit. As of March 2015, 12 students have completed their PhD under his supervision, and 10 of his postdocs have obtained a permanent position in research or university education.

== Research ==
After working on qualitative decision theory, Leon van der Torre turned towards cognitive science and agent theory. He developed the BOID agent architecture (with colleagues from the Vrije Universiteit), created the area of input/output logics (with David Makinson), and the game-theoretic approach to normative multi-agent systems (with Guido Boella from the University of Turin). He initiated the workshops on coordination and organization (CoOrg), on interdisciplinary perspectives on roles (ROLES), and on normative multi-agent systems (NORMAS). He became an ECCAI Fellow in 2015.

Leon van der Torre is furthermore the editor of the deontic logic corner of the Journal of Logic and Computation, a member of the editorial boards of the Logic Journal of the IGPL and the IfCoLog Journal of Logics and their Applications, chair of the DEON steering committee, a member of the CLIMA steering committee, and an editor of the Handbooks of Deontic Logic and Normative Systems, with further handbooks in preparation.

== Personal life ==
Leon van der Torre has been married to the artist Egberdien van der Torre – van der Peijl since 2000. They have two sons.
