= Marija Slavkovik =

Norwegian computer scientist

Marija Slavkovik (born 1979, also spelled Slavkovic and Slavkovikj) is a computer scientist specializing in machine ethics, the ethics of artificial intelligence, and computational social choice. Originally from Yugoslavia and North Macedonia, she was educated in Austria, Italy, and Luxembourg, and has worked in the UK and Norway, where she is a professor at the University of Bergen.

== Early life, education, and career ==
Slavkovik was born in 1979 in Skopje, at that time part of Yugoslavia and since 1991 the capital of North Macedonia. She studied electrical engineering at the Ss. Cyril and Methodius University of Skopje, receiving a diploma there in 2005. Next, through joint studies at TU Wien in Vienna, Austria, and the Free University of Bozen-Bolzano in Italy, she received a master's degree in computational logic in 2007, supervised by Raffaella Bernardi. She defended her dissertation in 2012 at the University of Luxembourg, with Leon van der Torre as her doctoral advisor and coadvised by Gabriella Pigozzi of Paris Dauphine-PSL University.

Following her doctorate, she was a postdoctoral researcher at the University of Liverpool in the UK from 2012 to 2013, and at the University of Bergen beginning in 2013. She remained at the University of Bergen as a faculty member, becoming an associate professor in the Department of Information Science and Media Studies and Faculty of Social Sciences of the University of Bergen in 2017. She was promoted to full professor in 2020, and chaired the department from 2021 to 2025.

== Recognition ==
Slavkovik is a member of the Norwegian Academy of Technological Sciences (NTVA).
