= Argumentation scheme =

Type of argument

In argumentation theory, an argumentation scheme or argument scheme is a template that represents a common type of argument used in ordinary conversation. Many different argumentation schemes have been identified. Each one has a name (for example, argument from effect to cause) and presents a type of connection between premises and a conclusion in an argument, and this connection is expressed as a rule of inference. Argumentation schemes can include inferences based on different types of reasoning—deductive, inductive, abductive, probabilistic, etc.

The study of argumentation schemes (under various names) dates back to the time of Aristotle, and today argumentation schemes are used for argument identification, argument analysis, argument evaluation, and argument invention.

Some basic features of argumentation schemes can be seen by examining the scheme called argument from effect to cause, which has the form: "If A occurs, then B will (or might) occur, and in this case B occurred, so in this case A presumably occurred." This scheme may apply, for example, when someone argues: "Presumably there was a fire, since there was smoke and if there is a fire then there will be smoke." This example looks like the formal fallacy of affirming the consequent ("If A is true then B is also true, and B is true, so A must be true"), but in this example the material conditional logical connective ("A implies B") in the formal fallacy does not account for exactly why the semantic relation between premises and conclusion in the example, namely causality, may be reasonable ("fire causes smoke"), while not all formally valid conditional premises are reasonable (such as in the valid modus ponens argument "If there is a cat then there is smoke, and there is a cat, so there must be smoke"). As in this example, argumentation schemes typically recognize a variety of semantic (or substantive) relations that inference rules in classical logic ignore. More than one argumentation scheme may apply to the same argument; in this example, the more complex abductive argumentation scheme may also apply.

== Overview ==
Since the beginning of the discipline called rhetoric, the study of the types of argument has been a central issue. Knowledge of types of argument allows a speaker to find the argument form that is most suitable to a specific subject matter and situation. For example, arguments based on authority may be common in courts of law but not as frequent in a classroom discussion; arguments based on analogy are often effective in political discourse, but may be problematic in a scientific discussion.

The two interrelated goals of argument identification and analysis were the core of ancient dialectics (similar to debate), and specifically the branch called topics. In the 20th century, the ancient interest in types of arguments was revived in several academic disciplines, including education, artificial intelligence, legal philosophy, and discourse analysis.

The study of this ancient subject is mostly carried out today in the field of study called argumentation theory under the name of argumentation schemes.

An example of an argumentation scheme is the scheme for argument from position to know given below.

Argument from position to know
Premise:	a is in a position to know whether A is true or false.
Assertion premise:	a asserts that A is true ([or] false).
Conclusion:	A may plausibly be taken to be true ([or] false).

Following the usual convention in argumentation theory, arguments are given as a list of premises followed by a single conclusion. The premises are the grounds given by the speaker or writer for the hearer or reader to accept the conclusion as true or as provisionally true (regarded as true for now). An argumentation scheme's definition is not itself an argument, but represents the structure of an argument of a certain type. The letters in the scheme, lower case a and upper case A, need to be filled in if an argument is to be created from the scheme. Lower case a would be replaced by the name of a person and upper case A by a proposition, which might be true or false.

Argumentation theorist Douglas N. Walton gives the following example of an argument that fits the argument from position to know scheme: "It looks as if this passer-by knows the streets, and she says that City Hall is over that way; therefore, let's go ahead and accept the conclusion that City Hall is that way."

== History ==
Among 20th-century authors, Chaïm Perelman and Lucie Olbrechts-Tyteca may have been the first to write at length about argumentation schemes, which they called argumentative schemes. They present a long list of schemes together with explanation and examples in part three of The New Rhetoric (1958). The argumentation schemes in The New Rhetoric are not described in terms of their logical structure, as in more recent scholarship on argumentation schemes; instead they are given prose descriptions. The structure of the arguments is, nevertheless, considered important by the authors.

Perelman and Olbrechts-Tyteca also suggest a link between argumentation schemes and the loci (Latin) or topoi (Greek) of classical writers. Both words, literally translated, mean "places" in their respective languages. Loci is a Latin translation of the Greek, topoi, used by Aristotle in his work, Topics, about logical argument and reasoning. Perelman and Olbrechts-Tyteca explain loci as: "headings under which arguments can be classified". And they write, "They are associated with a concern to help a speaker's inventive efforts and involve the grouping of relevant material, so that it can be easily found again when required." While Aristotle's treatment of topoi is not the same as the modern treatment of argumentation schemes, it is reasonable to consider Aristotle as the first writer in the genre.

The first contemporary writer to treat argumentation schemes in the way they are treated by current scholars and the way they are described in this article may have been Arthur Hastings in his 1962 Ph.D. dissertation.

== Forms of inference ==
The study of argument in the field of argumentation theory since Perelman and Olbrechts-Tyteca's The New Rhetoric and Stephen Toulmin's The Uses of Argument, both first published in 1958, has been characterized by a recognition of the defeasible, non-monotonic nature of most ordinary everyday arguments and reasoning. A defeasible argument is one that can be defeated, and that defeat is achieved when new information is discovered that shows that there was a relevant exception to an argument in the presence of which the conclusion can no longer be accepted. A common example used in textbooks concerns Tweety, a bird that may or may not fly:

(All) birds can fly;
Tweety is a bird;
Therefore, Tweety can fly.

This argument (with the addition of "All", which is shown in parentheses) has the form of a logical syllogism and is, therefore, valid. If the first two statements, the premises, are true, then the third statement, the conclusion, must also be true. However, if it is subsequently learned that Tweety is a penguin or has a broken wing, we can no longer conclude that Tweety can fly. In the context of deductive inference, we would have to conclude that the first premise was simply false. Deductive inference rules are not subject to exceptions. But there can be defeasible generalizations (defeasible inference rules). When we say that birds can fly, we mean that it is generally the case, subject to exceptions. We are justified in making the inference and accepting the conclusion that this particular bird can fly until we find out that an exception applies in this particular case.

In addition to deductive inference and defeasible inference, there is also probabilistic inference. A probabilistic version of the generalization, "birds can fly", might be: "There is a 75% chance that a bird will be found to be able to fly" or "if something is a bird it probably can fly". The probabilistic version is also capable of being defeated (it is defeasible), but it includes the idea that the uncertainty might be quantifiable according to axioms of probability. (An exact number need not be attached as in the first example.)

In some theories, argumentation schemes are mostly schemes for arguments with defeasible inference although there could be schemes for specialized areas of discourse using other forms of inference, such as probability in the sciences. For most or all everyday arguments, the schemes are defeasible.

In other theories, the argumentation schemes are deductive or there is an attempt to interpret the schemes in a probabilistic way.

== Examples ==
=== Argument from expert opinion ===
Argument from expert opinion can be considered a sub-type of the argument from position to know presented at the beginning of the article. In this case, the person who is in a position to know is an expert who knows about some field.

Argument from expert opinion
Major premise:	Source E is an expert in subject domain S containing proposition A.
Minor premise:	E asserts that proposition A is true (false).
Conclusion:	A is true (false).

=== Critical questions ===
The schemes of Walton (1996) and Walton, Reed & Macagno (2008) come with critical questions. Critical questions are questions that could be asked to throw doubt on the argument's support for its conclusion. They are targeted toward key assumptions that, if true, make the argument acceptable. The reason these assumptions are presented in the form of questions is that these schemes are a part of a dialectical theory of argumentation. An argument is dialectical when it is a back and forth of argument and rebuttal or questioning. This can be the case even when there is only one reasoner, presenting arguments, then seeking out new information or sources of doubt, or critically probing their own initial assumptions. Since everyday arguments are typically defeasible, this is an approach to strengthening a case over time, testing each element of the case and discarding those parts that do not stand up to scrutiny. The critical questions for argument from expert opinion, given in Walton, Reed & Macagno (2008), are shown below.

Critical questions for argument from expert opinion
CQ1: Expertise question:	How credible is E as an expert source?
CQ2: Field question:	Is E an expert in the field that A is in?
CQ3: Opinion question:	What did E assert that implies A?
CQ4: Trustworthiness question:	Is E personally reliable as a source?
CQ5: Consistency question:	Is A consistent with what other experts assert?
CQ6: Backup evidence question:	Is E's assertion based on evidence?

Another version of the scheme argument from expert opinion, given in a textbook by Groarke, Tindale & Little (2013), does not include critical questions. Instead more of the key assumptions are included as additional premises of the argument.

=== Argument from ignorance ===
Argument from ignorance can be stated in a very informal way as, "if it were true, I would know it". Walton gives the following example of an argument from ignorance: "The posted train schedule says that train 12 to Amsterdam stops at Haarlem and Amsterdam Central Station. We want to determine whether the train stops at Schipol. We can reason as follows: Since the schedule did not indicate that the train stops at Schipol, we can infer that it does not stop at Schipol." Examples very much like this are well known in computer science discussions about the closed-world assumption for databases. One can assume that the train operating authority has a policy of maintaining a complete database of all of the stops and of publishing accurate schedules. In such cases it is fairly well assured that the information on the published schedule is correct even though it is possible for information to be missing from the database or not included in some particular schedule posting.

The scheme and its accompanying critical questions are shown below.

Argument from ignorance
Major premise:	If A were true, then A would be known to be true.
Minor premise:	It is not the case that A is known to be true.
Conclusion:	Therefore, A is not true.

Critical questions for argument from ignorance
CQ1:	How far along has the search for evidence progressed?
CQ2:	Which side has the burden of proof in the dialogue as a whole? In other words, what is the ultimate probandum [claim that is to be proved] and who is supposed to prove it?
CQ3:	How strong does the proof need to be in order for this party to be successful in fulfilling the burden?

These critical questions, CQ2 and CQ3 especially, show the dialectical nature of the theory from which this scheme derives (that is, the scheme is based on a back and forth exchange between different parties). Two dialectical concerns are considered. It might be the case, as in some legal systems, that there is a presumption favoring a certain position—e.g., a presumption of innocence favoring the accused. In that case, the burden of proof is on the accuser, and it would not be proper to argue in the opposite direction: "If the accused were innocent I would have known about it; I don't know about it; therefore, the accused is not innocent." Even if it were a proper argument, the standard of proof in such a case (as asked in CQ3) is very high, beyond a reasonable doubt, but the argument from ignorance alone might be very weak. When challenged, additional arguments would be needed to build a sufficiently strong case.

=== Other schemes ===
The following list is a selection of names of argumentation schemes from Walton, Reed & Macagno (2008); other sources may give different names:

- Argument from witness testimony
- Argument from popular opinion
- Argument from popular practice
- Argument from example
- Argument from composition
- Argument from division
- Argument from oppositions
- Argument from alternatives
- Argument from verbal classification
- Argument from definition to verbal classification
- Argument from vagueness of a verbal classification
- Argument from arbitrariness of a verbal classification
- Argument from interaction of act and person
- Argument from values
- Argument from the group and its members
- Practical reasoning argument
- Argument from waste
- Argument from sunk costs
- Argument from correlation to cause
- Argument from sign
- Argument from evidence to a hypothesis
- Argument from consequences
- Argument from threat
- Argument from fear appeal
- Argument from danger appeal
- Argument from need for help
- Argument from distress
- Argument from commitment
- Ethotic argument
- Generic ad hominem argument
- Pragmatic inconsistency argument
- Argument from inconsistent commitment
- Circumstantial ad hominem argument
- Argument from bias
- Bias ad hominem argument
- Argument from gradualism
- Slippery slope argument

See Practical reason § In argumentation for a description of argumentation schemes for practical reasoning.

== Relation to fallacies ==
Many of the names of argumentation schemes may be familiar because of their history as names of fallacies and because of the history of the teaching of fallacies in critical thinking and informal logic courses. In his groundbreaking work, Fallacies, C. L. Hamblin challenged the idea that the traditional fallacies are always fallacious. Subsequently, Walton described the fallacies as kinds of arguments; they can be used properly and provide support for conclusions, support which is, however, provisional and the arguments defeasible. When used improperly they can be fallacious.

== Uses ==
Argumentation schemes are used for argument identification, argument analysis, argument evaluation, and argument invention.

=== Argument identification ===
Argument identification is the identification of arguments in a text or spoken discourse. Many or most of the statements will not be arguments or parts of arguments. But some of those statements might look similar to arguments. Informal logicians have especially noted the similarity between words used to express arguments and those used to express explanations. Words like "because" or "since" can be used to introduce reasons that justify argumentative positions, but they can also be used to introduce explanations: e.g., "something is the way it is because of the following explanation". Schemes may aid in argument identification because they describe factors that distinguish the argument type from other text. For example, an argument from expert opinion refers to an expert and a field of expertise, both of which could be identified in a text. Some schemes contain more easily distinguished characteristics than others.

==== Argument mining ====
Argument mining is the automatic identification of arguments in natural language using computing technology. It also includes some of the tasks of argument analysis. The same benefits from the use of argumentation schemes as described above for identification and analysis are relevant to argument mining. Linguistic features that distinguish specific schemes can be used by computer algorithms to identify instances of those schemes and therefore automatically identify the arguments that are of those kinds. Without the ability to notice such argumentative patterns, only features common to all arguments would be available. Feng & Hirst (2011) proposed using argumentation schemes to automatically help fill in missing (implicit) premises in arguments, and they experimented with detecting instances of such schemes. Similar work was done by Lawrence and Reed, and reported in 2016.

=== Argument analysis ===
Argument analysis is distinguishing the premises and conclusion of an argument and determining their relationships (such as whether they are linked or convergent—see Argument map § Key features for diagrams of such relationships), determining the form of inference, and making explicit any implicit premises or conclusions. (These are the tasks of analysis from a logical perspective. When discourse and rhetorical analyses are considered, there would be additional tasks.)

The logical analysis of arguments is especially made difficult by the presence of implicit elements. Their being implicit means that they are not present in the text (or spoken discourse) as statements; nevertheless, they are understood by the reader or hearer because of nonverbal elements or because of shared background knowledge from the social, cultural, or other shared, context. The implicit elements are also elements that are needed to make the argument cogent. Arguments containing implicit elements are called enthymemes, which is a term that was used by Aristotle in his works about dialectical reasoning and argument. If an argument appears to match a scheme but is missing some elements, the scheme could be used as a guide to determining what is implicit in the argument. An additional challenge with regard to this task could be that some schemes are easy to confuse. In Perelman and Olbrechts-Tyteca's concept of argumentative scheme, different schemes could apply to the same argument depending on the interpretation of the argument or the argument could be described by multiple schemes. Hansen and Walton also write that arguments may fit multiple schemes.

=== Argument evaluation ===
Argument evaluation is the determination of the goodness of the argument: determining how good the argument is and whether, or with what reservations, it ought to be accepted. As mentioned above, in schemes accompanied by critical questions, a measure of the goodness of the argument is whether the critical questions can be appropriately answered. In other schemes, as in the example of the versions of argument from expert opinion in Groarke, Tindale & Little (2013), only good arguments fit the scheme because the criteria for goodness are included as premises, so if any one of the premises is false, the conclusion should not be accepted.

=== Argument invention ===
Argument invention is making new arguments to suit the occasion. As mentioned above, Perelman and Olbrechts-Tyteca attribute that use to the loci and topoi of the classical argumentation theorists. They form a catalog of argument types from which arguers may draw in constructing their arguments. With argumentation schemes described by their structure with single letter variables as placeholders, constructing such arguments is just a matter of filling in the placeholders. The arguer could use other words that convey the same meaning and embellish the argument in other ways.

== See also ==
- Decisional balance, or balance-of-considerations reasoning
- Design pattern
- Heuristic
- Pattern language
- Pedagogical pattern
- Rule of thumb
