= Alfred Gell =

British anthropologist

Alfred Antony Francis Gell, FBA (/ɡɛl/; June 12, 1945 – January 28, 1997) was a British social anthropologist whose most influential work concerned art, language, symbolism and ritual. He was trained by Edmund Leach (MPhil, Cambridge University) and Raymond Firth (PhD, London School of Economics) and did his fieldwork in Melanesia and tribal India. Gell taught at the London School of Economics, among other places. He was also a Fellow of the British Academy. He died of cancer in 1997, at the age of 51.

== Thought ==
In his posthumously published 1998 book Art and Agency, Gell formulated an influential theory of art based on abductive reasoning. Gell argues that art in general (although his attention focuses on visual artifacts, like the prows of the boats of the Trobriand islands) acts on its users, i.e. achieves agency, through a sort of technical virtuosity. Art can enchant the viewer, who is always a blind viewer, because "the technology of enchantment is founded on the enchantment of technology" (the title of a previous essay on aesthetics by Gell is The Technology of Enchantment and the Enchantment of Technology, 1992). Gell closely follows different forms of effectiveness of 'technical virtuosity' of the artist. For him it comes to a stylistic virtuosity, able to get some sort of living presence response, reacting to works of art as if they were living beings or even people acting (agency), entering into a personal relationship with them, triggering love, hate, desire or fear. In this way for Gell works of art, in all cultures, are able to create shared common sense, especially through reasoning with abduction, which already in Aristotle is a less strong inference than induction and deduction, more intuitive and concise. Gell takes it from the semiotician Charles Sanders Peirce as a case of synthetic inference, where you are in very strange circumstances, which could be explained by the supposition that it is a case obedient to some rule, and therefore we adopt such a supposition.

Artworks therefore mediate social agency by using the logical mechanism of abduction: those who observe the works of art do abductions about the intentions of those who produced them, or even just exposed them to public use. The logical mechanism of aesthetical abduction for Gell is a transcultural one. In his seminal works, "The Enchantment of Technology and the Technology of Enchantment" (1992), and Art and Agency (1998) he draws together the ways of acting in idolatry, fetishism, and witchcraft with contemporary Western art to illustrate the commonalities in how objects mediate and act on social relations.

== Selected bibliography ==
- 1975 Metamorphosis of the Cassowaries: Umeda Society, Language and Ritual. London: Athlone.
- 1980 The Gods at Play: Vertigo and Possession in Muria Religion，Man, New Series, Vol. 15, No. 2 (Jun., 1980), pp. 219–248.
- 1982 The Market Wheel: Symbolic Aspects of an Indian Tribal Market，Man, New Series, Vol. 17, No. 3 (Sep., 1982), pp. 470–491.
- 1992a Under the Sign of the Cassowary. In Shooting the Sun: Ritual and Meaning in the West Sepik. B. Juillerat, ed. pp. 125–143. Washington, D.C.; Smithsonian Institution Press.
- 1992b The Technology of Enchantment and the Enchantment of Technology. In Anthropology, Art and Aesthetics. J. Coote and A. Shelton, eds. pp. 40–66. Oxford: Clarendon.
- 1992c The Anthropology of Time: Cultural Constructions of Temporal Maps and Images. Oxford: Berg.
- 1993 Wrapping in Images: Tattooing in Polynesia. Oxford: Clarendon.
- 1995 On Coote's "Marvels of Everyday Vision". Social Analysis, 38: 18–31.
- 1995 The Language of the Forest: Landscape and Phonological Iconism in Umeda. In The Anthropology of Landscape: Perspectives on Place and Space. E. Hirsch and M. O'Hanlon, eds. pp. 232–254. Oxford: Clarendon.
- 1996 Vogel's Net: Traps as Artworks and Artworks as Traps. Journal of Material Culture, 1:15-38.
- 1998 Art and Agency: An Anthropological Theory. Oxford: Clarendon.
- 1999 The Art of Anthropology: Essays and Diagrams. E. Hirsch, ed. London: Athlone.

== See also ==
- Aesthetics
- Art
- Cultural anthropology
