= Artur d'Avila Garcez =

British computer scientist

- Born: 1970 (age 55–56)
- Education: Imperial College London (PhD)
- Known for: Neural-symbolic learning systems
- Scientific career
- Fields: Computational logic, neural computation, hybrid systems
- Workplaces: City, University of London
- Thesis: Nonmonotonic Theory Refinement in Artificial Neural Networks (2000)
- Doctoral advisor: Dov Gabbay

Artur d'Avila Garcez (born 1970) is a researcher in the field of computational logic and neural computation, in particular hybrid systems with application in software verification and information extraction. His contributions include neural-symbolic learning systems and nonclassical models of computation combining robust learning and reasoning. He is a Professor of Computer Science at City, University London.

Garcez is co-author of Neural-Symbolic Learning Systems and Neural-Symbolic Cognitive Reasoning. He is an editor of the Journal of Logic and Computation, Oxford University Press and associate member of Behavioral and Brain Sciences, Cambridge University Press. He is listed in Marquis Who's Who in the World and Marquis Who's Who in Science and Engineering.

Garcez received his PhD from Imperial College London in 2000 under the supervision of Dov Gabbay. The title of his thesis is Nonmonotonic Theory Refinement in Artificial Neural Networks.
