= Douglas N. Walton =

Canadian academic and author (1942–2020)

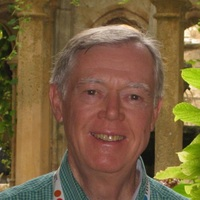
- Born: Douglas Neil Walton; 2 June 1942; Hamilton, Ontario
- Died: 3 January 2020 (aged 77); Ontario, Canada

Academic background
- Education: University of Waterloo; University of Toronto
- Thesis: The Meaning of 'Can': A Study in the Philosophy of Language
- Doctoral advisor: John Woods

Academic work
- Discipline: Communication; philosophy
- Institutions: University of Winnipeg; Netherlands Institute for Advanced Study; University of Windsor
- Main interests: Argumentation theory
- Notable ideas: Woods–Walton approach

Douglas Neil Walton (2 June 1942 – 3 January 2020) was a Canadian academic and author, known for his books and papers on argumentation, logical fallacies and informal logic. He was a Distinguished Research Fellow of the Centre for Research in Reasoning, Argumentation, and Rhetoric (CRRAR) at the University of Windsor, Ontario, Canada, and before that (2008–2014), he held the Assumption Chair of Argumentation Studies at the University of Windsor. Walton's work has been used to better prepare legal arguments and to help develop artificial intelligence.

A special issue of the journal Informal Logic surveyed Walton's contributions to informal logic and argumentation theory up to 2006.

== Education ==
Walton earned his PhD from the University of Toronto in 1972.

== Work ==
Walton's work represents a distinctive approach built around a set of practical methods to help a user identify, analyze, and evaluate arguments in specialized areas such as law and science, as well as arguments of the kind used in everyday conversational discourse. Walton has called this approach logical argumentation, and as a method it has twelve defining characteristics, shown below in a simplified list.

1. The method analyzes and evaluates argumentation concerning a contestable claim, one where there is evidence for the claim as well as against it. The claim is tested evidentially by the pro and con arguments that support or attack it.
2. The procedure for examining and criticizing the arguments on both sides forms a dialogue structure in which two sides, the claimant and its opponent, take turns putting forward speech acts (for example, asking questions and putting forward arguments).
3. The dialogue has rules for incurring and retracting commitments that are activated by speech acts. For example, when a participant makes an assertion (claim), he or she becomes committed to the proposition contained in the assertion.
4. The method uses the notion of commitment (acceptance) as the fundamental tool for the analysis and evaluation of argumentation rather than the notion of belief. The reason is that belief is held to be a psychological notion internal to an agent that can only be determined indirectly, by inference to the best explanation of the agent's speech and actions.
5. The method assumes a database of commonly accepted knowledge that, along with other commitments, provides premises for arguments. The knowledge base is set in place at the opening stage, but can be revised as new relevant information comes in.
6. The method comprises the study of explanations as well as arguments, including the form of argument called inference to the best explanation or abductive reasoning.
7. The dialogue system is dynamic, meaning that it continually updates its database as new information comes in that is relevant to an argument being considered.
8. The arguments advanced are (for the most part) defeasible, meaning that they are subject to defeat as new relevant evidence comes in that refutes the argument.
9. Conclusions are accepted on a presumptive basis, meaning that in the absence of evidence sufficient to defeat it, a claim that is the conclusion of an argument can be tentatively accepted, even though it may be subject to later defeat.
10. The dialogue uses critical questioning as a way of testing plausible explanations and finding weak points in an argument that raise doubt concerning the acceptability of the argument.
11. The method uses standards of proof. Criteria for acceptance are held to depend on standards that require the removal of specifiable degrees of reasonable doubt.
12. The method is based on argumentation schemes, such as argument from expert opinion, that represent commonly used types of arguments that are defeasible.

In the method, schemes work as heuristic devices that only offer presumptive support of a claim that may have to be withdrawn as new evidence comes in. The schemes connect arguments together into sequences, often called chaining, by taking the conclusion of one argument as a premise in a subsequent argument. Some common schemes are argument from goal-based reasoning, argument from negative consequences, argument from positive consequences, inference to the best explanation (abductive reasoning), argument from sign, argument from analogy, argument from precedent, argument from an established rule, argument from evidence to a hypothesis, argument from cause to effect, argument from correlation to cause, argument from sunk costs, argument from threat, argument from perception, argument from witness testimony, argument from expert opinion, argument from ignorance, argument from commitment, direct ad hominem argument, argument from inconsistency of commitments, slippery slope argument.

== Bibliography ==
- The Douglas Walton Reader, Catherine Hundleby et al editors, Windsor Studies in Argumentation, 2024
- Statutory Interpretation - Pragmatics and Argumentation, D. Walton, F. Macagno, G. Sartor, Cambridge University Press, 2021.
- Handbook of legal reasoning and argumentation, G. Bongiovanni, G. Postema, A. Rotolo, G. Sartor, C. Valentini, D. Walton (editors), Springer, 2018.
- Interpreting Straw Man Argumentation: The Pragmatics of Quotation and Reporting, Springer, 2017.
- Argument Evaluation and Evidence, Springer, 2015.
- Goal-based Reasoning for Argumentation, Cambridge, Cambridge University Press, 2015.
- Burden of Proof, Presumption and Argumentation, Cambridge, Cambridge University Press, 2014.
- Emotive Language in Argumentation, F. Macagno and D. Walton, Cambridge, Cambridge University Press, 2014.
- Methods of Argumentation, Cambridge, Cambridge University Press, 2013.
- Argumentation Schemes, D. Walton, C. Reed and F. Macagno, Cambridge, Cambridge University Press, 2008.
- Informal Logic: A Pragmatic Approach, second edition, Cambridge, Cambridge University Press, 2008.
- Witness Testimony Evidence: Argumentation, Artificial Intelligence and Law, Cambridge, Cambridge University Press, 2008.
- Dialog Theory for Critical Argumentation, Amsterdam, John Benjamins Publishers, 2007.
- Media Argumentation: Dialectic, Persuasion and Rhetoric, Cambridge, Cambridge University Press, 2007.
- Character Evidence: An Abductive Theory, Berlin, Springer, 2007.
- Fallacies: Selected Papers: 1972–1982, J. Woods and D. Walton, Studies in Logic, vol. 7, London, King's College, 2007.
- Fundamentals of Critical Argumentation, Cambridge, Cambridge University Press, 2006.
- Argumentation Methods for Artificial Intelligence in Law, Berlin, Springer, 2005.
- Abductive Reasoning, Tuscaloosa, University of Alabama Press, 2004.
- Relevance in Argumentation, Mahwah, N.J., Lawrence Erlbaum Associates, 2004.
- Ethical Argumentation, Lanham, Md., Lexington Books, 2002.
- Legal Argumentation and Evidence, University Park, Pa., Penn State Press, 2002.
- Scare Tactics: Arguments that Appeal to Fear and Threats, Dordrecht, Kluwer Academic Publishers, 2000.
- Appeal to Popular Opinion, University Park, Pa., Penn State Press, 1999.
- One-Sided Arguments: A Dialectical Analysis of Bias, Albany, State University of New York Press, 1999.
- Ad Hominem Arguments, Tuscaloosa, University of Alabama Press, 1998.
- The New Dialectic, Toronto, University of Toronto Press, 1998.
- Appeal to Expert Opinion: Arguments from Authority, University Park, Pa., Penn State Press, 1997.
- Appeal to Pity: Argumentum ad Misericordiam (SUNY Series in Logic and Language), Albany, SUNY Press, 1997.
- Historical Foundations of Informal Logic, (co-edited with A. Brinton), Aldershot, England, Ashgate Publishing, 1997.
- Argument Structure: A Pragmatic Theory, Toronto, University of Toronto Press, 1996.
- Argumentation Schemes for Presumptive Reasoning, Mahwah, N.J., Lawrence Erlbaum Associates, 1996.
- Arguments from Ignorance, University Park, Pa., Penn State Press, 1996.
- Fallacies Arising from Ambiguity, Dordrecht, Kluwer Academic Publishers, 1996.
- Commitment in Dialogue: Basic Concepts of Interpersonal Reasoning, D. Walton and E. C. W. Krabbe, Albany, SUNY Press, 1995.
- A Pragmatic Theory of Fallacy, Tuscaloosa, University of Alabama Press, 1995.
- The Place of Emotion in Argument, University Park, Pa., Penn State Press, 1992.
- Plausible Argument in Everyday Conversation, Albany, State University of New York Press, 1992.
- Slippery Slope Arguments. Oxford, Clarendon Press, 1992.
- Begging the Question: Circular Reasoning as a Tactic of Argumentation, New York, Greenwood Press, 1991.
- Practical Reasoning: Goal-Driven, Knowledge-Based, Action-Guiding Argumentation, Savage, Maryland, Rowman and Littlefield, 1990.
- Informal Logic: A Handbook for Critical Argumentation, Cambridge, Cambridge University Press, 1989.
- Question-Reply Argumentation, Westport, Connecticut, Greenwood Press, 1989.
- Informal Fallacies (Pragmatics and Beyond Companion Series, IV), Amsterdam, John Benjamins, 1987.
- Courage: A Philosophical Investigation, Berkeley, U. of California Press, 1986.
- Arguer's Position: A Pragmatic Study of Ad Hominem Attack, Criticism, Refutation, and Fallacy, Westport, Connecticut, Greenwood Press, 1985.
- Physician-Patient Decision-Making, Westport, Connecticut, Greenwood Press, 1985.
- Logical Dialogue-Games and Fallacies, Lanham, Maryland, University Press of America, 1984.
- Ethics of Withdrawal of Life Support Systems, Westport, Connecticut, Greenwood Press, 1983.
- Topical Relevance in Argumentation, Amsterdam, John Benjamins, 1982.

== See also ==
- List of University of Waterloo people
- John Woods (logician)
