= John Woods (logician) =

Canadian logician and philosopher (1937–2024)

John Hayden Woods FRSC (16 March 1937 – 15 August 2024) was a Canadian logician and philosopher. He lately held the position of Director of the Abductive Systems Group at the University of British Columbia (UBC) and was the UBC Honorary Professor of Logic. He was also affiliated with the Group on Logic, Information and Computation within the Department of Informatics at King's College London where he held the Charles S. Peirce Visiting Professorship of Logic position from 2001.

Woods was a Fellow of the Royal Society of Canada, life member of the Association of Fellows of the Netherlands Institute for Advanced Study, and President Emeritus of the University of Lethbridge.

== Life and career ==
Woods was born in Barrie, Ontario on 16 March 1937. His education included a BA and MA in philosophy from the University of Toronto, and a 1965 PhD in philosophy from the University of Michigan where his adviser was Arthur Burks.

Together with Douglas N. Walton, Woods authored a number of books and papers on fallacies. According to Frans H. van Eemeren, who calls this body of work the Woods–Walton approach, this is "the most continuous and extensive post-Hamblin contribution to the study of fallacies".

A Festschrift honoring and discussing Woods' work was published in 2005 by the University of Toronto Press. The book includes respondeos of Woods to the various papers contained in the book and a profile of Woods in the form of an introduction written by Kent Peacock and Andrew Irvine.

Woods died on 15 August 2024, at the age of 87.

== Selected books ==
- (1974) Proof and Truth. Toronto: Peter Martin Associates
- (1974) The Logic of Fiction: A Philosophical Sounding of Deviant Logic. The Hague and Paris: Mouton and Co. A second edition was published in 2009 by College Publications, ISBN 1-904987-99-0
- (1978) Engineered Death: Abortion, Suicide, Euthanasia, Senecide. Ottawa: The University of Ottawa Press/Editions de l’Université d’Ottawa. ISBN 0-7766-1020-1
- (1982) Argument: The Logic of the Fallacies. Toronto and New York: McGraw-Hill (with Douglas N. Walton) ISBN 0-07-548026-3
- (1989) Fallacies: Selected Papers, 1972-82. Dordrecht and Providence: Foris (with Douglas Walton). A selection was translated in French and published with a new introduction in 1992 as Critique de l’Argumentation: Logiques des sophismes ordinaires, xii, 233, Paris: Éditions Kimé
- (2000) Argument: Critical Thinking Logic and The Fallacies. Toronto: Prentice-Hall (with Andrew Irvine and Douglas Walton). A 2nd edition was published in 2004: ISBN 0-13-039938-8
- (2001) Aristotle’s Earlier Logic. Oxford: Hermes Science Publications. ISBN 1-903398-20-7 (second revised edition London: College Publications, 2014)
- (2003) Paradox and Paraconsistency: Conflict Resolution in the Abstract Sciences. Cambridge: Cambridge University Press. ISBN 0-521-00934-0
- (2003) Agenda Relevance: An Essay in Formal Pragmatics. Volume 1 of A Practical Logic of Cognitive Systems, Amsterdam: North Holland (with Dov M. Gabbay) ISBN 0-444-51385-X
- (2004) The Death of Argument: Fallacies in Agent-Based Reasoning. Dordrecht and Boston: Kluwer. ISBN 1-4020-2663-3
- (2005) The Reach of Abduction: Insight and Trial. Volume 2 of A Practical Logic of Cognitive Systems, Amsterdam: North Holland (with Dov M. Gabbay) ISBN 0-444-51791-X

Moreover, Woods has been a co-editor (with Dov Gabbay) of the eleven-volume Handbook of the History of Logic, published by North-Holland (now Elsevier), as well as editor, with Gabbay and Paul Thagard, of the sixteen-volume Handbook of the Philosophy of Science, by the same publisher.

== Sources ==
- 12/7/09 Home page – CV
