= Problem of multiple generality =

Failure in traditional logic to describe certain intuitively valid inferences

The problem of multiple generality names a supposed failure in traditional logic to describe valid inferences that involves multiple quantifiers. For example, it is intuitively clear that if:

Some cat is feared by every mouse

then it follows logically that:

All mice are afraid of at least one cat.

The syntax of traditional logic (TL) permits exactly one quantifier, i.e. there are four sentence types: "All A's are B's", "No A's are B's", "Some A's are B's" and "Some A's are not B's". Since the sentences above each contain two quantifiers ('some' and 'every' in the first sentence and 'all' and 'at least one' in the second sentence), they cannot be adequately represented in TL. The best TL can do is to incorporate the second quantifier from each sentence into the second term, thus rendering the artificial-sounding terms 'feared-by-every-mouse' and 'afraid-of-at-least-one-cat'. This in effect "buries" these quantifiers, which are essential to the inference's validity, within the hyphenated terms. Hence the sentence "Some cat is feared by every mouse" is allotted the same logical form as the sentence "Some cat is hungry". And so the logical form in TL is:

Some A's are B's
All C's are D's

which is clearly invalid.

The first logical calculus capable of dealing with such inferences was Gottlob Frege's Begriffsschrift (1879), the ancestor of modern predicate logic, which dealt with quantifiers by means of variable bindings. Modestly, Frege did not argue that his logic was more expressive than extant logical calculi, but commentators on Frege's logic regard this as one of his key achievements.

Using modern predicate calculus, we quickly discover that the statement is ambiguous.

Some cat is feared by every mouse

could mean (Some cat is feared) by every mouse (paraphrasable as Every mouse fears some cat), i.e.

For every mouse m, there exists a cat c, such that c is feared by m,
$$\forall m \, (\, \text{Mouse}(m) \rightarrow \exists c \, (\text{Cat}(c) \land \text{Fears}(m,c)) \, )$$

in which case the conclusion is trivial.

But it could also mean Some cat is (feared by every mouse) (paraphrasable as There's a cat feared by all mice), i.e.

There exists one cat c, such that for every mouse m, c is feared by m.
$$\exists c \, ( \, \text{Cat}(c) \land \forall m \, (\text{Mouse}(m) \rightarrow \text{Fears}(m,c)) \, )$$

This example illustrates the importance of specifying the scope of such quantifiers as for all and there exists.
