= Argument =

Attempt to persuade or to determine the truth of a conclusion

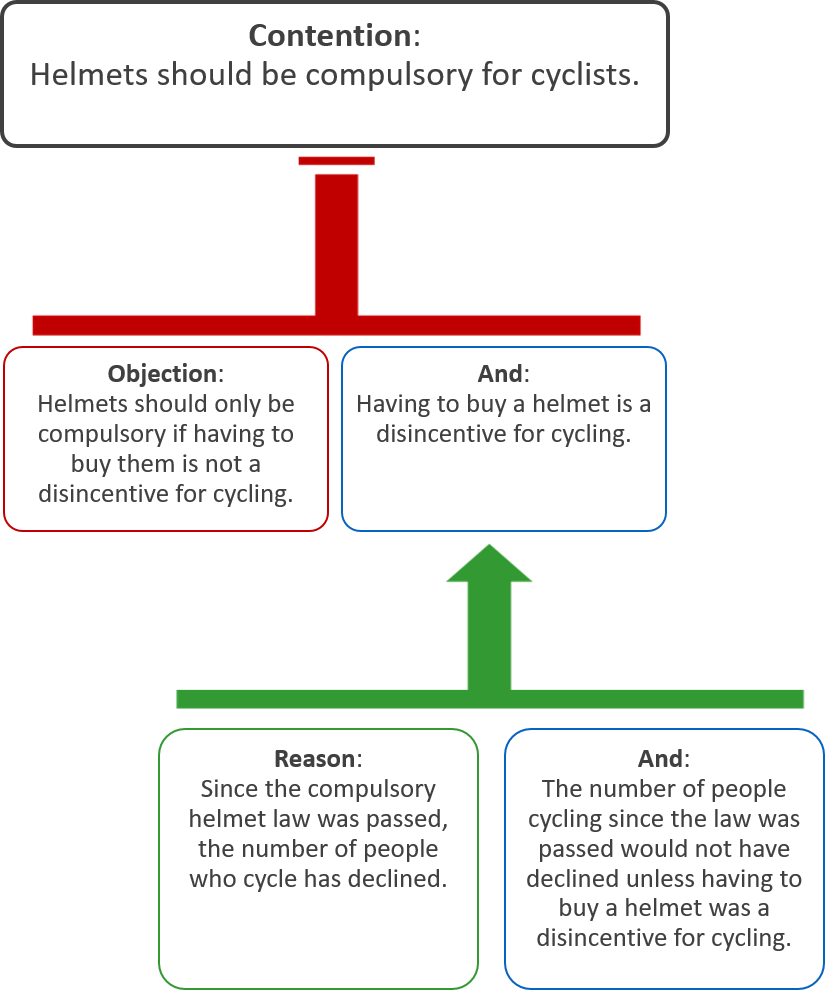
An argument illustrated by an argument map

An argument is one or more premises—sentences, statements, or propositions—directed towards arriving at a logical conclusion. The purpose of an argument is to give reasons for one's thinking and understanding via justification, explanation, or persuasion. As a series of logical steps, arguments are intended to determine or show the degree of truth or acceptability of a logical conclusion.

The process of crafting or delivering arguments, argumentation, can be studied from three main perspectives: through the logical, the dialectical, and the rhetorical perspective.

In logic, an argument is usually expressed not in natural language but in a symbolic formal language, and it can be defined as any group of propositions of which one is claimed to follow from the others through deductively valid inferences that preserve truth from the premises to the conclusion. This logical perspective on argument is relevant for scientific fields such as mathematics and computer science. Logic is the study of the forms of reasoning in arguments and the development of standards and criteria to evaluate arguments. Deductive arguments can be valid, and the valid ones can be sound: in a valid argument, premises necessitate the conclusion, even if one or more of the premises is false and the conclusion is false; in a sound argument, true premises necessitate a true conclusion. Inductive arguments, by contrast, can have different degrees of logical strength: the stronger or more cogent the argument, the greater the probability that the conclusion is true, the weaker the argument, the lesser that probability. The standards for evaluating non-deductive arguments may rest on different or additional criteria than truth—for example, the persuasiveness of so-called "indispensability claims" in transcendental arguments, the quality of hypotheses in retroduction, or even the disclosure of new possibilities for thinking and acting.

In dialectics, and also in a more colloquial sense, an argument can be conceived as a social and verbal means of trying to resolve, or at least contend with, a conflict or difference of opinion that has arisen or exists between two or more parties. For the rhetorical perspective, the argument is constitutively linked with the context, in particular with the time and place in which the argument is located. From this perspective, the argument is evaluated not just by two parties (as in a dialectical approach) but also by an audience. In both dialectic and rhetoric, arguments are used not through formal but through natural language. Since classical antiquity, philosophers and rhetoricians have developed lists of argument types in which premises and conclusions are connected in informal and defeasible ways.

== Etymology ==
The Latin root arguere (to make bright, enlighten, make known, prove, etc.) is from Proto-Indo-European *argu-yo-, suffixed form of *arg- (to shine; white).

== Formal and informal ==
Informal arguments as studied in informal logic, are presented in ordinary language and are intended for everyday discourse. Formal arguments are studied in formal logic (historically called symbolic logic, more commonly referred to as mathematical logic today) and are expressed in a formal language. Informal logic emphasizes the study of argumentation; formal logic emphasizes implication and inference. Informal arguments are sometimes implicit. The rational structure—the relationship of claims, premises, warrants, relations of implication, and conclusion—is not always spelled out and immediately visible and must be made explicit by analysis.

== Standard logical account of argument types ==
Argument terminology

There are several kinds of arguments in logic, the best known of which are "deductive" and "inductive." An argument has one or more premises but only one conclusion. Each premise and the conclusion are truth bearers or "truth-candidates", each capable of being either true or false (but not both). These truth values bear on the terminology used with arguments.

=== Deductive arguments ===
A deductive argument asserts that the truth of the conclusion is a logical consequence of the premises: if the premises are true, the conclusion must be true. It would be self-contradictory to assert the premises and deny the conclusion because the negation of the conclusion is contradictory to the truth of the premises. Based on the premises, the conclusion follows necessarily (with certainty). Given premises that A=B and B=C, then the conclusion follows necessarily that A=C. Deductive arguments are sometimes referred to as "truth-preserving" arguments. For example, consider the argument that because bats can fly (premise=true), and all flying creatures are birds (premise=false), therefore bats are birds (conclusion=false). If we assume the premises are true, the conclusion follows necessarily, and it is a valid argument.

==== Validity ====
In terms of validity, deductive arguments may be either valid or invalid. An argument is valid, if and only if (iff) it is impossible in all possible worlds for the premises to be true and the conclusion false; validity is about what is possible; it is concerned with how the premises and conclusion relate and what is possible. An argument is formally valid if and only if the denial of the conclusion is incompatible with accepting all the premises.

In formal logic, the validity of an argument depends not on the actual truth or falsity of its premises and conclusion, but on whether the argument has a valid logical form. The validity of an argument is not a guarantee of the truth of its conclusion. A valid argument may have false premises that render it inconclusive: the conclusion of a valid argument with one or more false premises may be true or false.

Logic seeks to discover the forms that make arguments valid. A form of argument is valid if and only if the conclusion is true under all interpretations of that argument in which the premises are true. Since the validity of an argument depends on its form, an argument can be shown invalid by showing that its form is invalid. This can be done by a counter example of the same form of argument with premises that are true under a given interpretation, but a conclusion that is false under that interpretation. In informal logic this is called a counter argument.

The form of an argument can be shown by the use of symbols. For each argument form, there is a corresponding statement form, called a corresponding conditional, and an argument form is valid if and only if its corresponding conditional is a logical truth. A statement form which is logically true is also said to be a valid statement form. A statement form is a logical truth if it is true under all interpretations. A statement form can be shown to be a logical truth by either (a) showing that it is a tautology or (b) by means of a proof procedure.

The corresponding conditional of a valid argument is a necessary truth (true in all possible worlds) and so the conclusion necessarily follows from the premises, or follows of logical necessity. The conclusion of a valid argument is not necessarily true, it depends on whether the premises are true. If the conclusion, itself, is a necessary truth, it is without regard to the premises.

Some examples:

- All Greeks are human and all humans are mortal; therefore, all Greeks are mortal. : Valid argument; if the premises are true the conclusion must be true.
- Some Greeks are logicians and some logicians are tiresome; therefore, some Greeks are tiresome. Invalid argument: the tiresome logicians might all be Romans (for example).
- Either we are all doomed or we are all saved; we are not all saved; therefore, we are all doomed. Valid argument; the premises entail the conclusion. (This does not mean the conclusion has to be true; it is only true if the premises are true, which they may not be!)
- Some men are hawkers. Some hawkers are rich. Therefore, some men are rich. Invalid argument. This can be more easily seen by giving a counter-example with the same argument form:
  - Some people are herbivores. Some herbivores are zebras. Therefore, some people are zebras. Invalid argument, as it is possible that the premises be true and the conclusion false.

In the above second to last case (Some men are hawkers ...), the counter-example follows the same logical form as the previous argument, (Premise 1: "Some X are Y." Premise 2: "Some Y are Z." Conclusion: "Some X are Z.") in order to demonstrate that whatever hawkers may be, they may or may not be rich, in consideration of the premises as such. (See also: Existential import).

The forms of argument that render deductions valid are well-established, however some invalid arguments can also be persuasive depending on their construction (inductive arguments, for example). (See also: Formal fallacy and Informal fallacy).

==== Soundness ====
An argument is sound when the argument is valid and argument's premise(s) is/are true, therefore the conclusion is true.

=== Inductive arguments ===
An inductive argument asserts that the truth of the conclusion is supported by the probability of the premises. For example, given that the military budget of the United States is the largest in the world (premise=true), then it is probable that it will remain so for the next 10 years (conclusion=true). Arguments that involve predictions are inductive since the future is uncertain. An inductive argument is said to be strong or weak. If the premises of an inductive argument are assumed true, is it probable the conclusion is also true? If yes, the argument is strong. If no, it is weak. A strong argument is said to be cogent if it has all true premises. Otherwise, the argument is uncogent. The military budget argument example is a strong, cogent argument.

Non-deductive logic is reasoning using arguments in which the premises support the conclusion but do not entail it. Forms of non-deductive logic include the statistical syllogism, which argues from generalizations true for the most part, and induction, a form of reasoning that makes generalizations based on individual instances. An inductive argument is said to be cogent if and only if the truth of the argument's premises would render the truth of the conclusion probable (i.e., the argument is strong), and the argument's premises are, in fact, true. Cogency can be considered inductive logic's analogue to deductive logic's "soundness". Despite its name, mathematical induction is not a form of inductive reasoning. The lack of deductive validity is known as the problem of induction.

== Defeasible arguments and argumentation schemes ==
In modern argumentation theories, arguments are regarded as defeasible passages from premises to a conclusion. Defeasibility means that when additional information (new evidence or contrary arguments) is provided, the premises may be no longer lead to the conclusion (non-monotonic reasoning). This type of reasoning is referred to as defeasible reasoning. For instance we consider the famous Tweety example:

Tweety is a bird.
Birds generally fly.
Therefore, Tweety (probably) flies.

This argument is reasonable and the premises support the conclusion unless additional information indicating that the case is an exception comes in. If Tweety is a penguin, the inference is no longer justified by the premise. Defeasible arguments are based on generalizations that hold only in the majority of cases, but are subject to exceptions and defaults.

In order to represent and assess defeasible reasoning, it is necessary to combine the logical rules (governing the acceptance of a conclusion based on the acceptance of its premises) with rules of material inference, governing how a premise can support a given conclusion (whether it is reasonable or not to draw a specific conclusion from a specific description of a state of affairs).

Argumentation schemes have been developed to describe and assess the acceptability or the fallaciousness of defeasible arguments. Argumentation schemes are stereotypical patterns of inference, combining semantic-ontological relations with types of reasoning and logical axioms and representing the abstract structure of the most common types of natural arguments. A typical example is the argument from expert opinion, shown below, which has two premises and a conclusion.

Argument from expert opinion
Major Premise:	Source E is an expert in subject domain S containing proposition A.
Minor Premise:	E asserts that proposition A is true (false).
Conclusion:	A is true (false).

Each scheme may be associated with a set of critical questions, namely criteria for assessing dialectically the reasonableness and acceptability of an argument. The matching critical questions are the standard ways of casting the argument into doubt.

== By analogy ==
Argument by analogy may be thought of as argument from the particular to particular. An argument by analogy may use a particular truth in a premise to argue towards a similar particular truth in the conclusion. For example, if A. Plato was mortal, and B. Socrates was like Plato in other respects, then asserting that C. Socrates was mortal is an example of argument by analogy because the reasoning employed in it proceeds from a particular truth in a premise (Plato was mortal) to a similar particular truth in the conclusion, namely that Socrates was mortal.

== Other kinds ==
Other kinds of arguments may have different or additional standards of validity or justification. For example, philosopher Charles Taylor said that so-called transcendental arguments are made up of a "chain of indispensability claims" that attempt to show why something is necessarily true based on its connection to our experience, while Nikolas Kompridis has suggested that there are two types of "fallible" arguments: one based on truth claims, and the other based on the time-responsive disclosure of possibility (world disclosure). Kompridis said that the French philosopher Michel Foucault was a prominent advocate of this latter form of philosophical argument.

=== World-disclosing ===
World-disclosing arguments are a group of philosophical arguments that according to Nikolas Kompridis employ a disclosive approach, to reveal features of a wider ontological or cultural-linguistic understanding—a "world", in a specifically ontological sense—in order to clarify or transform the background of meaning (tacit knowledge) and what Kompridis has called the "logical space" on which an argument implicitly depends.

== Explanations ==
While arguments attempt to show that something was, is, will be, or should be the case, explanations try to show why or how something is or will be. If Fred and Joe address the issue of whether or not Fred's cat has fleas, Joe may state: "Fred, your cat has fleas. Observe, the cat is scratching right now." Joe has made an argument that the cat has fleas. However, if Joe asks Fred, "Why is your cat scratching itself?" the explanation, "... because it has fleas." provides understanding.

Both the above argument and explanation require knowing the generalities that a) fleas often cause itching, and b) that one often scratches to relieve itching. The difference is in the intent: an argument attempts to settle whether or not some proposition or claim is true, and an explanation attempts to provide understanding of the event. Note, that by subsuming the specific event (of Fred's cat scratching) as an instance of the general rule that "animals scratch themselves when they have fleas", Joe will no longer wonder why Fred's cat is scratching itself. Arguments address problems of belief, explanations address problems of understanding. In the argument above, the statement, "Fred's cat has fleas" is up for debate (i.e. is a claim), but in the explanation, the statement, "Fred's cat has fleas" is assumed to be true (unquestioned at this time) and just needs explaining.

Arguments and explanations largely resemble each other in rhetorical use. This is the cause of much difficulty in thinking critically about claims. There are several reasons for this difficulty.

- People often are not themselves clear on whether they are arguing for or explaining something.
- The same types of words and phrases are used in presenting explanations and arguments.
- The terms 'explain' or 'explanation,' et cetera are frequently used in arguments.
- Explanations are often used within arguments and presented so as to serve as arguments.
- Likewise, "... arguments are essential to the process of justifying the validity of any explanation as there are often multiple explanations for any given phenomenon."

Explanations and arguments are often studied in the field of information systems to help explain user acceptance of knowledge-based systems. Certain argument types may fit better with personality traits to enhance acceptance by individuals.

== Fallacies and non-arguments ==
Fallacies are types of argument or expressions which are held to be of an invalid form or contain errors in reasoning.

One type of fallacy occurs when a word frequently used to indicate a conclusion is used as a transition (conjunctive adverb) between independent clauses. In English the words therefore, so, because and hence typically separate the premises from the conclusion of an argument. Thus: Socrates is a man, all men are mortal therefore Socrates is mortal is an argument because the assertion Socrates is mortal follows from the preceding statements. However, I was thirsty and therefore I drank is not an argument, despite its appearance. It is not being claimed that I drank is logically entailed by I was thirsty. The therefore in this sentence indicates for that reason not it follows that.

== Elliptical or ethymematic arguments ==
Often an argument is invalid or weak because there is a missing premise—the supply of which would make it valid or strong. This is referred to as an elliptical or enthymematic argument (see also Enthymeme § Syllogism with an unstated premise). Speakers and writers will often leave out a necessary premise in their reasoning if it is widely accepted and the writer does not wish to state the blindingly obvious. Example: All metals expand when heated, therefore iron will expand when heated. The missing premise is: Iron is a metal. On the other hand, a seemingly valid argument may be found to lack a premise—a "hidden assumption"—which, if highlighted, can show a fault in reasoning. Example: A witness reasoned: Nobody came out the front door except the milkman; therefore the murderer must have left by the back door. The hidden assumptions are: (1) the milkman was not the murderer and (2) the murderer has left (3) by a door and (4) not by e.g. a window or through an 'ole in 't roof and (5) there are no other doors than the front or back door.

== Argument mining ==
The goal of argument mining is the automatic extraction and identification of argumentative structures from natural language text with the aid of computer programs. Such argumentative structures include the premise, conclusions, the argument scheme and the relationship between the main and subsidiary argument, or the main and counter-argument within discourse.

== See also ==
- Abductive reasoning
- Argument map
- Bayes' theorem
- Belief bias
- Boolean logic
- Cosmological argument
- Evidence-based policy
- Logical reasoning
- Practical arguments
- Semantic argument
