= Journal of Logic and Computation =

- Discipline: Computer science
- Language: English
- Edited by: Dov Gabbay

Publication details
- History: 1990–present
- Publisher: Oxford University Press
- Frequency: Bimonthly

Standard abbreviations
- ISO 4: J. Log. Comput.
- MathSciNet: J. Logic Comput.

Indexing
- ISSN: 0955-792X (print); 1465-363X (web)

Links
- Journal homepage

The Journal of Logic and Computation is a peer-reviewed academic journal focused on logic and computing. It was established in 1990 and is published by Oxford University Press under licence from Professor Dov Gabbay as owner of the journal.
