= Illative sense =

Epistemological concept

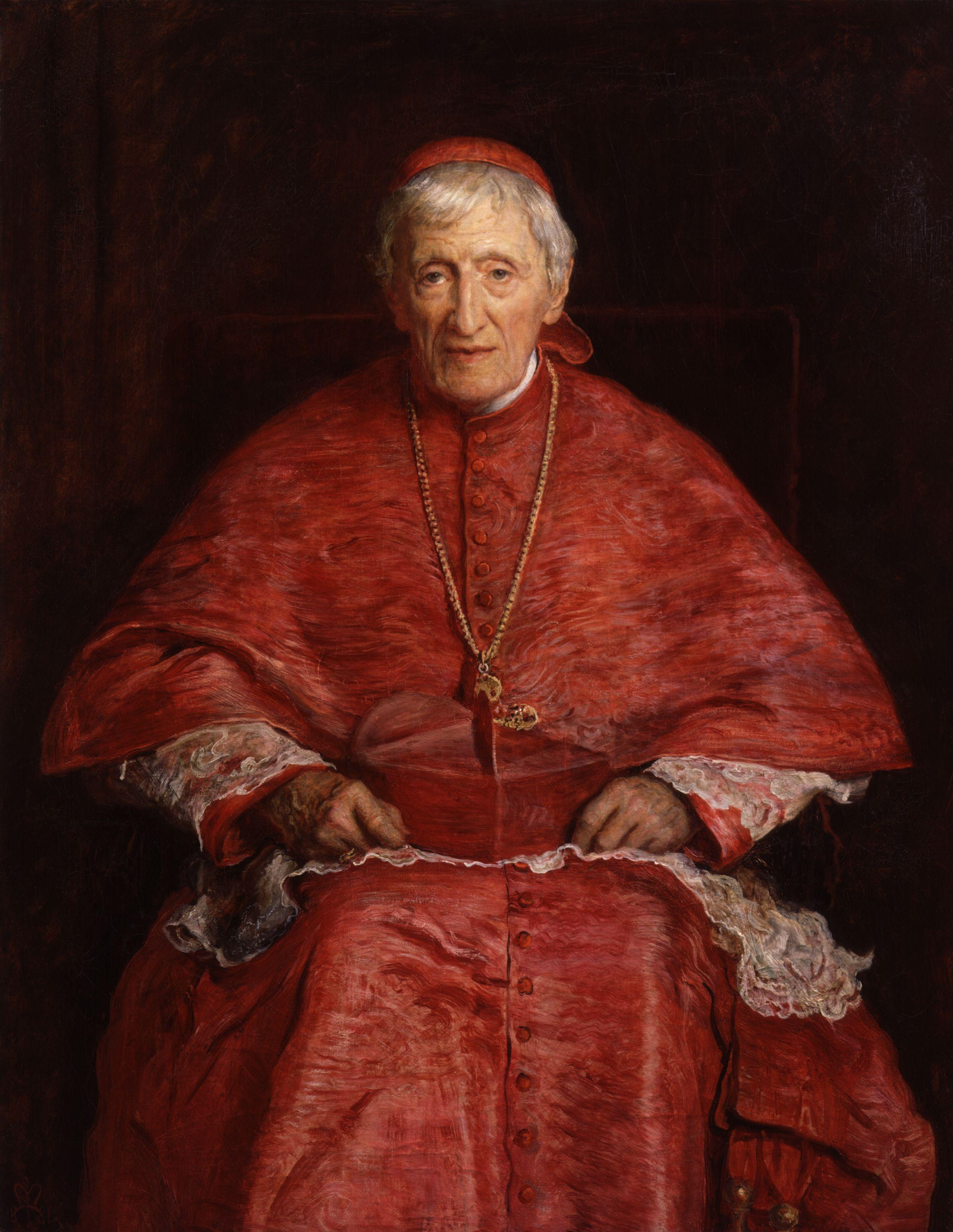
John Henry Newman, who coined the concept

The illative sense is an epistemological concept coined by Catholic academic John Henry Newman (1801–1890) in his Grammar of Assent. For him it is the unconscious process of the mind, by which probabilities converge into certainty.

== Origin of the term ==
Newman wrestled 20 years before he wrote the Essay in Aid of a Grammar of Assent. His difficulty was that some people do believe in supernatural agents, and others do not. It is hard to get to the real cause of this difference. And, although supernatural reasons might be given from theology, as a philosopher he also looked into ordinary life experiences: when and why do we start or stop believing a person? He discovered that real assent, i.e. firm belief, as opposed to notional assent, comes about, not through ordinary syllogisms, but by a mysterious cumulation of probabilities of lived experience. There must be, therefore, in the mind a power that collects, accumulates, and connects probabilities to a higher degree of certainty.

For this power, or inner sense, he uses the neologism "illative sense". The term itself is derived from the Latin verb fero-tuli-latus, meaning "to bring". "Illative" means, then, "to bring in". For Newman it is the automatic data-collecting and -processing capacity in the sub-conscious mind, by which we get to know better or deeper both the content and certainty of the first principles of our knowledge, and of many natural and supernatural (religious) concepts and notional and/or real assents thereof.

== Applications ==
For Newman the term was a neologism, in order to give a name to the process of acquiring religious assent. But in his Grammar he uses many examples from ordinary life: from travels to military history. Of course, it applied to his own gradual conversion from Anglicanism to Catholicism: "For myself, it was not logic, then, that carried me on; as well might one say that the quicksilver in the barometer changes the weather. It is the concrete being that reasons; pass a number of years, and I find my mind in a new place; how? the whole man moves; paper logic is but the record of it."

== Influences and similar concepts ==
Some compare Newman's illative sense to Michael Polanyi's Tacit knowledge.

== Literature ==
- Frederick D. Aquino, Fundamental Theology Communities of Informed Judgment: Newman's Illative Sense and Accounts of Rationality, Washington, D.C.: The Catholic University of America Press, 2004
- Logan Paul Gage & Frederick D. Aquino, “Newman’s Illative Sense Re-Examined”, in: Frederick D. Aquino & Matthew Levering, John Henry Newman’s An Essay in Aid of a Grammar of Assent: A Critical Guide, Steubenville, Ohio: Emmaus Academic, 2025, pp. 183-202
- Jay Newman, The Mental Philosophy of John Henry Newman, Waterloo, Ont.: Wilfrid Laurier Univ. Press, 1986, ch. 6: “The Illative Sense”
- Aiden Nichols, "John Henry Newman and the Illative Sense: A Re-consideration", in: Scottish Journal of Theology 38(1985)3, pp. 347 - 368
- John David Ryan, "The Relation of the Illative Sense to the Act of Assent According to J. H. Newman", MA Thesis, Loyola University Chicago, 1959
- Francisco Sánchez Leyva, "The "illative sense" of truth, According to John Henry Newman", in: Theologica Xaveriana 63(2013), nr. 176, pp. 487-506
- Dr. Zeno, "Newman's Psychological Discovery: The Illative Sense", in: Franciscan Studies 10(1950)2, pp. 114-148
- Dr. Zeno, "Newman's Psychological Discovery: The Illative Sense", in: Franciscan Studies 10(1950)3, pp. 207-240
- Dr. Zeno, "Newman's Psychological Discovery: The Illative Sense" (Continued), in: Franciscan Studies 10(1950)4, pp. 418-440
- Dr. Zeno, "Newman's Psychological Discovery: The Illative Sense" (Continued) VI, in: Franciscan Studies 11(1951)1, pp. 40-73
- Dr. Zeno, "The Illative Sense", in: Franciscan Studies 12(1952)1, pp. 91-138
- Dr. Zeno, "Synthesis: The Existence of the Illative Sense", in: Franciscan Studies 12(1952)2, pp. 196-213
- Dr. Zeno, "The Illative Sense", in: Franciscan Studies 12(1952)3/4, pp. 263-300
- Dr. Zeno, Our Way to Certitude. An Introduction to Newman’s Psychological Discovery: The Illative Sense, and its Grammar of Assent, Leiden: Brill, 1957
