= Dov Gabbay =

Israeli logician (born 1945)

Dov M. Gabbay
- דב גבאי
- Born: October 26, 1945 (age 80)
- Education: Hebrew University (BSc, MSc, PhD)
- Known for: Gabbay's separation theorem, foundations for non-monotonic reasoning in expert systems
- Awards: Foreign Fellow of the Royal Society of Canada (FRSC); Fellow of the Alexander von Humboldt Foundation (FAvH)
- Scientific career
- Fields: Computer science Mathematics; Philosophy; Logic
- Workplaces: King's College London; Bar-Ilan University; University of Luxembourg; University of Manchester; Imperial College London; Université Paul Sabatier; Ashkelon Academic College
- Thesis: Non-classical Logics (1969)
- Doctoral advisor: Azriel Lévy; Michael O. Rabin
- Doctoral students: Alessandra Russo; Artur d'Avila Garcez; Amihood Amir

Dov M. Gabbay (/ɡəˈbeɪ/, Hebrew: דב גבאי; born October 26, 1945) is an Israeli logician. He is Augustus De Morgan Professor Emeritus of Logic at the Group of Logic, Language and Computation, Department of Computer Science, King's College London.

== Work ==
Gabbay has authored over four hundred and fifty research papers and over thirty research monographs. He is editor of several international journals, and of many reference works and handbooks of logic, including the Handbook of Philosophical Logic (with Franz Guenthner), the Handbook of Logic in Computer Science (with Samson Abramsky and T. S. E. Maibaum), the Handbook of the History of Logic (with John Woods), the Handbook of Deontic Logic and Normative Systems (with John F. Horty, Xavier Parent, Ron van der Meyden and Leendert van der Torre), and the Handbook of Logic in Artificial Intelligence and Logic Programming (with C.J. Hogger and J.A. Robinson).

He is well-known for pioneering work on logic in computer science and artificial intelligence, especially the application of (executable) temporal logics in computer science, in particular formal verification, the logical foundations of non-monotonic reasoning and artificial intelligence, the introduction of fibring logics and the theory of labelled deductive systems.

He is chairman and founder of several international conferences, executive of the European Foundation of Logic, Language and Information and President of the International IGPL Logic Group. He is founder, and joint President of the International Federation of Computational Logic. He is also one of the four founders and council member for many years of FoLLI, the Association of Logic, Language and Information, from which he is now retired. He remains a life member.

He is co-founder with Jane Spurr of College Publications, a not-for-profit, start-up academic publisher, intended to compete with major expensive publishers at affordable prices, and not requiring copyright assignment from authors. A two volume Festschrift in his honor was published in 2005 by College Publications.

== Dov Gabbay Prize ==
The Dov Gabbay Prize for Logic and Foundations is an international research prize awarded to scholars for their contributions to logic. The prize was established in 2022 on the occasion of Dov Gabbay's 77th birthday in honour of his scientific and editorial work. The recipients of the prize are decided by an independent committee of six internationally well-known logicians representing mathematical, philosophical, and computational logic.

The list of past recipients is maintained by the Initiative for Logic and Foundations at the University of Luxembourg.

- 2023. Dale Miller and Mirek Truszczynski.
- 2024. David Asperó and Ralf Schindler.
- 2025. Alexandru Baltag.

== Regular positions ==
- 1968–1970 – Instructor, Hebrew University of Jerusalem
- 1970–1973 – Assistant Professor of Philosophy, Stanford University
- 1973–1975 – Associate Professor of Philosophy, Stanford University
- 1975–1977 – Associate Professor, Bar-Ilan University
- 1977–1983 – Lady Davis Professor of Logic, Bar-Ilan University
- 1983–1998 – Professor of Computing, Imperial College of Science, Technology and Medicine, London
- 1998–present – Professor of Computing, Professor of Philosophy, Augustus De Morgan Professor of Logic, King's College, London
- 2009–present – Special Professor Bar-Ilan University
- 2015–2017 – Professor of Logics, Ashkelon Academic College

== Selected writings ==
- Samson Abramsky, Dov M. Gabbay, T.S.E. Maibaum. Handbook of Logic in Computer Science, Vols.1-5. Clarendom Press, Oxford, 1992–2000.
- Artur S. d'Avila Garcez, Luis C. Lamb, Dov Gabbay. Neural-Symbolic Cognitive Reasoning. Springer, 2009. ISBN 978-3540732457
- Michael D. Fisher, Dov M. Gabbay, Lluis Vila (eds). Handbook of temporal reasoning in artificial intelligence. Elsevier, 2005.
- Dov M. Gabbay: Theoretical foundations for non-monotonic reasoning in expert systems. In: Apt K.R. (ed) Logics and Models of Concurrent Systems. NATO ASI Series (Series F: Computer and Systems Sciences), vol 13. Springer, Berlin, Heidelberg, pp. 439–457, 1985.
- Dov M. Gabbay (ed). What is a logical system? Studies in Logic and Computation, Oxford University Press, 1994.
- Dov M. Gabbay. Labelled Deductive Systems, vol.1. Clarendon Press, Oxford, 1996. ISBN 9780198538332
- Dov M. Gabbay. Fibring Logics. Clarendon Press, Oxford, 1998. ISBN 9780191590108
- Dov M. Gabbay, Ian Hodkinson, Mark Reynolds: Temporal Logic: Mathematical Foundations and Computational Aspects, vol. 1. Clarendon Press, Oxford, 1994. ISBN 978-0198537694
- Dov M. Gabbay, Agi Kurucz, Frank Wolter, Michael Zakharyaschev: Many-dimensional modal logics: theory and applications. North-Holland, 2003.
- Dov M. Gabbay, Amir Pnueli, Saharon Shelah, Jonathan Stavi. On the temporal analysis of fairness. POPL'80: Proceedings of the 7th SIGPLAN-SIGACT ACM Annual Symposium on Principles of Programming Languages, January, 1980, pages 163–173, ACM Press.
- Dov M. Gabbay and John Woods. Agenda Relevance: A Study in Formal Pragmatics. North-Holland, 2003.
- Ruth M. Kempson, Wilfried Meyer-Viol, Dov M. Gabbay: Dynamic syntax: The flow of language understanding Archived 27 May 2019 at the Wayback Machine. Blackwell, 2000. ISBN 978-0-631-17612-1
- Dov M. Gabbay, Model theory for tense logics, Jerusalem : Applied Logic Branch, The Hebrew University of Jerusalem, 1969.
