= Ralph Johnson (philosopher) =

Canadian American philosopher (born 1940)

- Born: Ralph Henry Johnson; 1940 (age 85–86); Detroit, Michigan
- Occupation: Professor
- Known for: Founding member of the informal logic movement in North America

Ralph Henry Johnson (born 1940) is a Canadian-American philosopher, born in Detroit, Michigan. Johnson has been credited as one of the founding members of the informal logic movement in North America, along with J. Anthony Blair who co-published one of the movement's most influential texts, Logical Self-Defense, with Johnson. Alongside its founder, Blair, Johnson co-directed the Centre for Research in Reasoning, Argumentation, and Rhetoric at the University of Windsor. As Johnson and Blair write in the preface to the newest edition of Logical Self-Defense on the influential nature of the text:

"We might note that the theoretical perspective introduced in Logical Self-Defense has proved quite influential among textbook authors. It is to be found in modified form in A Practical Study of Argument by Trudy Govier, in Attacking Faulty Reasoning by T. Edward Damer, in Logic in Everyday Life and Open Minds and Everyday Reasoning by Zachary Seech, in Thinking Logically by James B. Freeman, and in Good Reasoning Matters by Leo Groarke and Christopher W. Tindale."

== Education and work ==
He earned an honors Bachelor of Arts at Xavier University and received his doctorate in philosophy from the University of Notre Dame in 1972. He has been a University Professor and University Professor emeritus at the University of Windsor, Ontario, Canada, where he had taught since 1966. He retired in Fall 2006 after 39 years, during which he served two terms as Head of Department. Ralph H. Johnson was a co-founder of the Newsletter of Informal Logic which has since become the Journal of Informal Logic in 1985, he also served as its co-editor along with J. Anthony Blair since its inception.

He was a co-chair for the International Symposium on Informal Logic in Windsor in 1978, 1983 and 1989. Ralph H. Johnson has lectured and published widely on informal logic, fallacy theory, argumentation, and critical thinking. He is a founding member and has been a previous member of the Executive Committee of the Association for Informal Logic and Critical Thinking (AILACT); as well as of the National Council for Excellence in Critical Thinking (NCECT), and of the Canadian Research Group on Argumentation (Carga). In 2004 he co-founded the Network for the Study of Reasoning, a cluster of Canadian experts researching the theory and its applications of reasoning and argument. He has given workshop presentations and has been a consultant on informal logic and critical thinking across the United States and Canada.

According to the University of Windsor's website, "His articles have appeared in such journals as American Philosophical Quarterly, Synthese, Argumentation, Philosophy and Rhetoric and Informal Logic. In 1996, a collection of his articles and papers was published by Vale Press under the title The Rise of Informal Logic. In 2000, his book, Manifest Rationality: A Pragmatic Study of Argument, was published by Lawrence Erlbaum Associates. Johnson has conducted seminars and workshops on informal logic and critical thinking across North America and in Europe. In 1993, Johnson received a 3M Teaching Fellowship for outstanding university teachers, one of ten such awards conferred that year in Canada. In 1994, he was awarded the rank of University Professor by the University of Windsor. In 2000, he was awarded the Distinguished Research Award by the International Society for the Study of Argumentation. In 2003, he was elected a Fellow of the Royal Society of Canada. In 2005, he received the Career Achievement Award from the University of Windsor. Johnson is listed in Who's Who in Canada."

Currently, Johnson is working on a book about sialectical [dialectical?]adequacy, which will be a follow-up to his work Manifest Rationality (2000).

== Personal life ==
According to Johnson's website, "I love to read, especially contemporary fiction. Among my favourite authors: John Updike, Alistair MacLeod, Joan Barfoot, Michael Connelly, Robert B. Parker. I love the plays of Shakespeare (especially King Lear), and attend the plays at Stratford every year. This year, I look forward to seeing Oliver and Much Ado about Nothing."

"I love to listen to music, especially classical. Currently I am in a Chopin phase. I also am drawn to the music of Bach, Beethoven, Haydn, Schubert and Dvorak. I belong to The Mankind Project.... — a worldwide organization dedicated to calling men to consciousness and lives of service. I serve as an Elder and Board member in our local community. I exercise (jog, walk or bike) almost everyday[sic]. I have been married to my wife Maggie for 38 years; have three children (Mary, Sean and Matthew) and two grandchildren — Brandin, 11, and Ivy Grace b. January 27, 2006!"

== Philosophy ==
As Johnson explains in Logical Self-Defense and his journal article "Making Sense of 'Informal Logic'", Informal Logic is the philosophical practice of understanding and evaluating natural language argumentation. Here fallacies are used in order to evaluate arguments. However, more simply the idea is to evaluate arguments based upon three essential criteria, again as explained in both "Making Sense of "Informal Logic"" and more thoroughly explained in Logical Self-Defense, the premises of arguments must be relevant to the conclusion, sufficient to support it and acceptable to the audience. In this approach to logic, fallacies such as the "straw man" and "red herring" point to a deficiency in the premises in one of these three criteria.

Johnson and Blair also place emphasis on how to identify arguments in everyday life, so that evaluators do not misinterpret the author's intention. In this way Logical Self-Defense identifies several different ways of interpreting arguments and their "look-alikes". For instance, they explain the distinctions between mere opinion, proto-argument, argument, case and explanation as well as provide criteria for helping to identify which is which, including context, verbal cues and logical structure.

In his article "Charity Begins at Home" in Informal Logic, Johnson combines and creates unified form of the "principle of charity" which he found to exist in four other forms in the works Thomas's Practical Reasoning in Natural Language (1973), Baum's Logic (1975) and in Scriven's Reasoning (1976). In doing so, he created a more developed "principle of charity" to which Informal Logicians could refer.

Accordingly, in this article section II attempts to unify these four versions by making one the foundation, while the others work as its corollaries. Then, after creating a better account of the "principle of charity", Johnson spends Section III of the article addressing some of the issues involved in the application of the "rinciple of charity" and finally Section IV addresses a proposed restriction for the use of the "principle of charity".

His article "The Principle of Vulnerability" in Informal Logic seeks to offer defence to the principle that all arguments should be considered susceptible to criticisms. As such Johnson argues that the arguer of an argument should not seek to "immunize" their argument from criticism. The article also takes considerations both in support of, and opposed to the principle into account.

In this article, one of the more notable ideas presented is the notion of "manifest rationality", which Johnson described in this way:

"The practice (of arguing) is characterized by a trait I call manifest rationality. In the practice of argumentation, rationality is not merely the inner reality but also the outward appearance of the practice. The practice must not just be rational; it must also appear rational. This is why the Arguer is expected to respond to objections and criticisms from others, and not ignore them or sweep them under the carpet. It's not just that sweeping them aside would not be rational and hence not be in keeping with the spirit of the practice. It's that it would be such an obvious violation of it—and it would be seen to be such."
