= Groarke =

Groarke is an Irish surname of Viking origin, derived from the Irish version Mag Ruairc, meaning 'son of Ruarc.' The name Ruarc originates from the Old Norse name Hrothrekr, which is derived from the Proto-Germanic *Hrōþirīks, combining *hrōþiz (fame, glory) and *ríks (king, ruler). This etymology aligns with various forms in Germanic languages such as Hrodric in Old High German, Hrēðrīc in Old English, and Hrǿríkʀ in Old Norse.

In Ireland, the Mag Ruairc family were chiefs of Cinel Enda (Cenél nEnna). The Cenél nEnna were a branch of the powerful Uí Néill dynasty in early medieval Ireland that claimed descent from Niall of the Nine Hostages. The Cenél nEnna had significant influence and control over territories that included parts of the ancient kingdom of Mide, and the Hill of Uisneach. In modern times, the Groarke name remained evident in County Westmeath and eventually became prominent in County Mayo.

Notable people with the surname include:

- Leo Groarke (born 1953), Canadian philosopher, brother of Louis Groarke
- Louis Groarke (born 1953), Canadian philosopher, brother of Leo Groarke
- Nikki Groarke (born 1962), British Anglican priest
- Raymond Groarke (born 1952), Irish judge
- Vona Groarke (born 1964), Irish poet
- Steven Groarke (born 1956), British psychoanalyst and academic

== See also ==
- Groark (surname)
