= Inferential =

Inferential may refer to:

- Inferential statistics; see statistical inference
- Inference (logic)
- Inferential mood (grammar)
- Inferential role semantics
- Inferential theory of learning
- Informal inferential reasoning
- Simple non-inferential passage
