= Trudy Govier =

Canadian philosopher

- Born: August 3, 1944 (age 82); Edmonton, Alberta
- Occupation: Philosopher
- Known for: Argumentation, Informal Logic, Trust and Forgiveness

Trudy Rose Govier (born August 3, 1944) is a Canadian philosopher known for her work in informal logic and argumentation. She is the author of the influential text A Practical Study of Argument. She has also been a frequent commentator in Canadian media on issues related to violence and conflict resolution.

== Career ==
Govier received her PhD in philosophy from the University of Waterloo in 1971. She has taught philosophy at Trent University, Simon Fraser University, the University of Amsterdam, the University of Calgary, the University of Lethbridge, and the University of Winnipeg. Much of Govier's work has surrounded practical argument, focusing on issues of trust, forgiveness, and reconciliation. She has been a distinguished visiting researcher with the Centre for Research in Reasoning, Argumentation, and Rhetoric at the University of Windsor. She retired from teaching in 2012.

The nature of Govier's approach to argumentation has prompted her to engage practically with social issues outside of academia. She is a founding member of the Calgary chapter of the peace activist organization Project Ploughshares and has been involved in labour advocacy.

== Selected works ==
- A Practical Study of Argument, 7th Edition (Belmont: Wadsworth, 2012)
- Taking Wrongs Seriously: Acknowledgement, Reconciliation, and the Politics of Sustainable Peace (Amherst, NY: Humanity Books, 2006)
- A Delicate Balance: What Philosophy Can Tell Us About Terrorism (Boulder, CO: Westview Press, 2002)
- Forgiveness and Revenge (London: Routledge, 2002)
- The Philosophy of Argument (Newport News, VA: Vale Press, 1999)
- Dilemmas of Trust (Montreal & Kingston: McGill-Queen's University Press, 1998)
- Social Trust and Human Communities Montreal & Kingston: McGill-Queen's University Press, 1997)
- Socrates' Children (Peterborough, ON: Broadview Press, 1997)
- God, the Devil, and the Perfect Pizza. (Peterborough, ON: Broadview Press, 1989)
- Problems in Argument Evaluation and Analysis (Dordrecht, NL and Berlin: Foris/deGruyter, 1987)
