= Boston Rowing Marathon =

- Frequency: Annual
- Locations: River Witham from Lincoln to Boston, in Lincolnshire, England
- Years active: 1946–2019
- Next event: N/A
- Participants: 283 crews (2006) – 137 crews (2016)
- Organiser: Boston Rowing Club & Lincoln Rowing Centre
- Website: www.bostonrowingclub.co.uk/boston-marathon

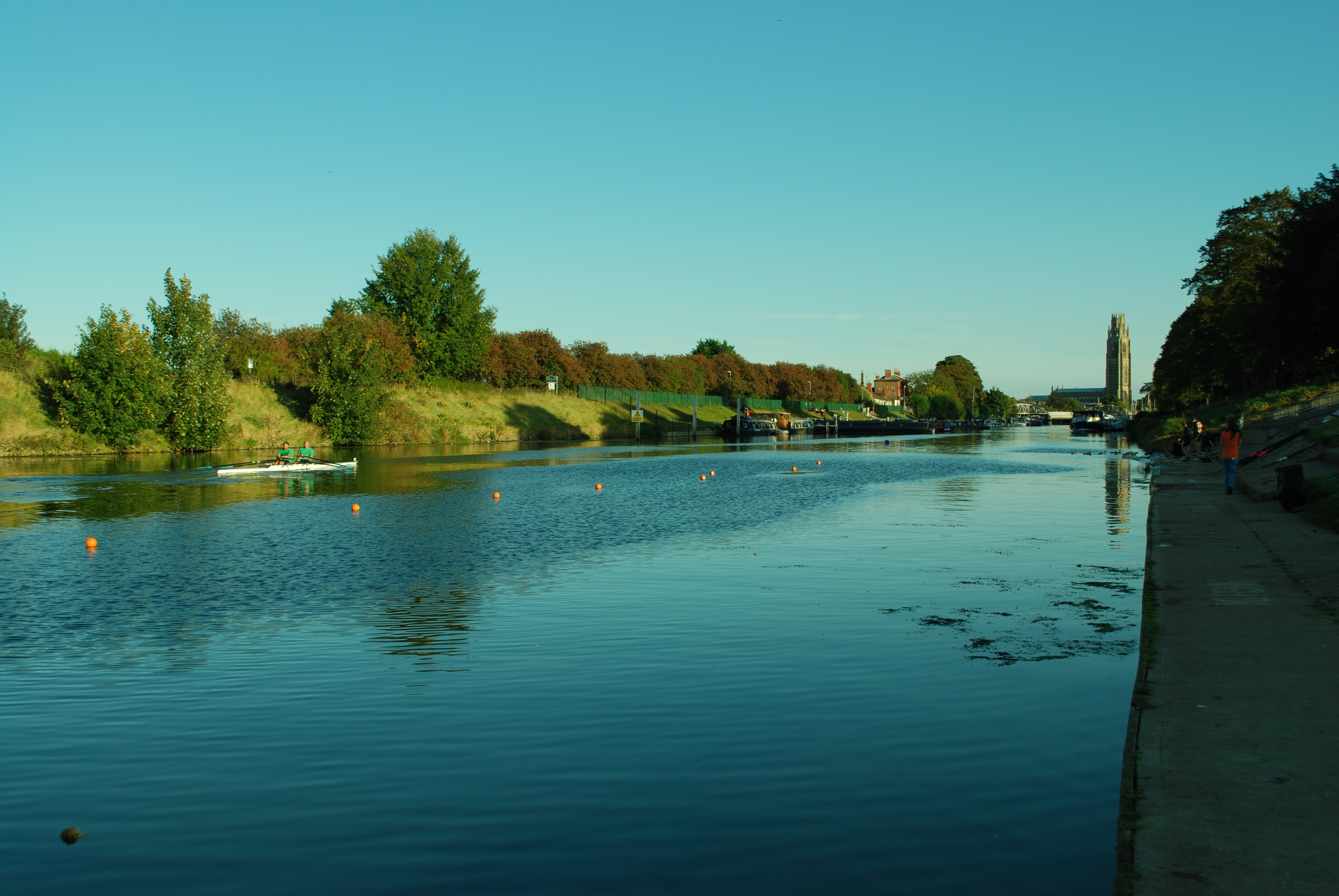
Finish

The Boston Rowing Marathon is a rowing head race taking place on the third Sunday of September annually in Lincolnshire, England, over the exceptionally long distance of 49.2 km (30.6 miles). The course is along the River Witham from Lincoln to Boston.

== Overview ==
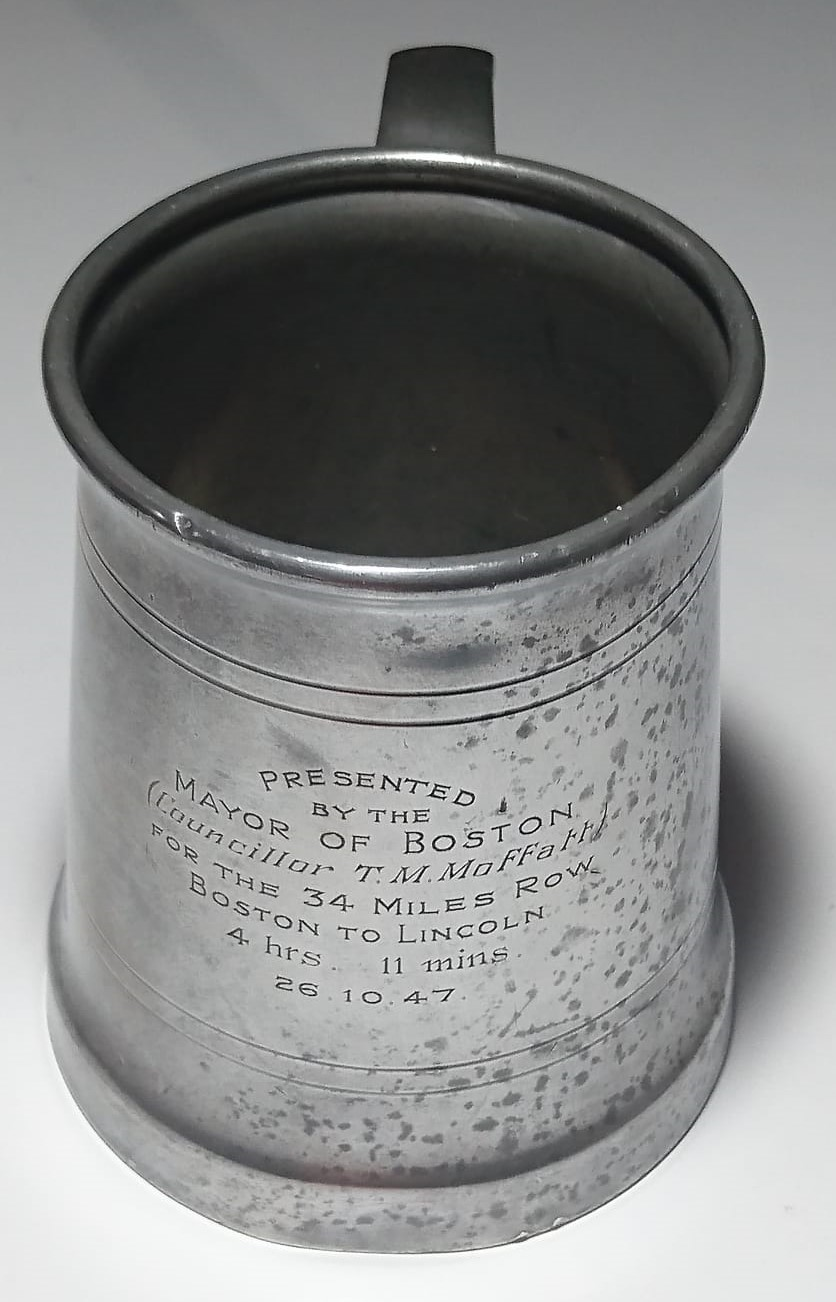
Pewter tankard awarded in 1947 to Bill Lockwood to recognise success in the Boston Rowing Marathon where four young men rowed 34 miles in 4 hs 11 m

The event started as a one off in 1946, a pub bet, and was big news for the town. A single coxed four of seniors rowed from central Boston to the Brayford Pool in central Lincoln (against the river flow) and took around six hours. A distance, measured at the time, of 34 miles.

On 26 October 1947, a teenaged coxed four from the Boston Rowing Club, took on the challenge of beating the 1946 time. Aubrey Fox, Deg Borman, Bill Gale and Bill Lockwood (AKA Dennis) completed the course in 4 hrs 11 mins and were each awarded an inscribed tankard by the mayor of Boston, TM Moffatt. In 1948 a solo rower covered the course (time unknown).

In 1949, Crowland Rowing Club became involved and the course was reversed to finish at Boston. It was easier to row with the flow and preferable to finish at the boathouse with the pub next door. In 1950 the event was opened to all competitors and has remained so to this day. The event is now organised by Boston Rowing Club.

The long distance of the event makes it unique in British rowing and thus attracts a lot of entries; some competing for a time, others only wanting to complete the distance. The event is also unusual in accepting entries from all crews and categories.

The current record for the 30.6 mile course is 2 h 59 min 45 s, set in 1991 by a University of London Boat Club men's eight. The race was cancelled in 2000, due to that year's fuel crisis, in 2011 due to an unusually prolific growth of water weed, and again in 2020 due to the COVID-19 pandemic. In 2021 the event was again cancelled due to COVID-19, but a solo club rower completed the course on the scheduled day.

== Course ==
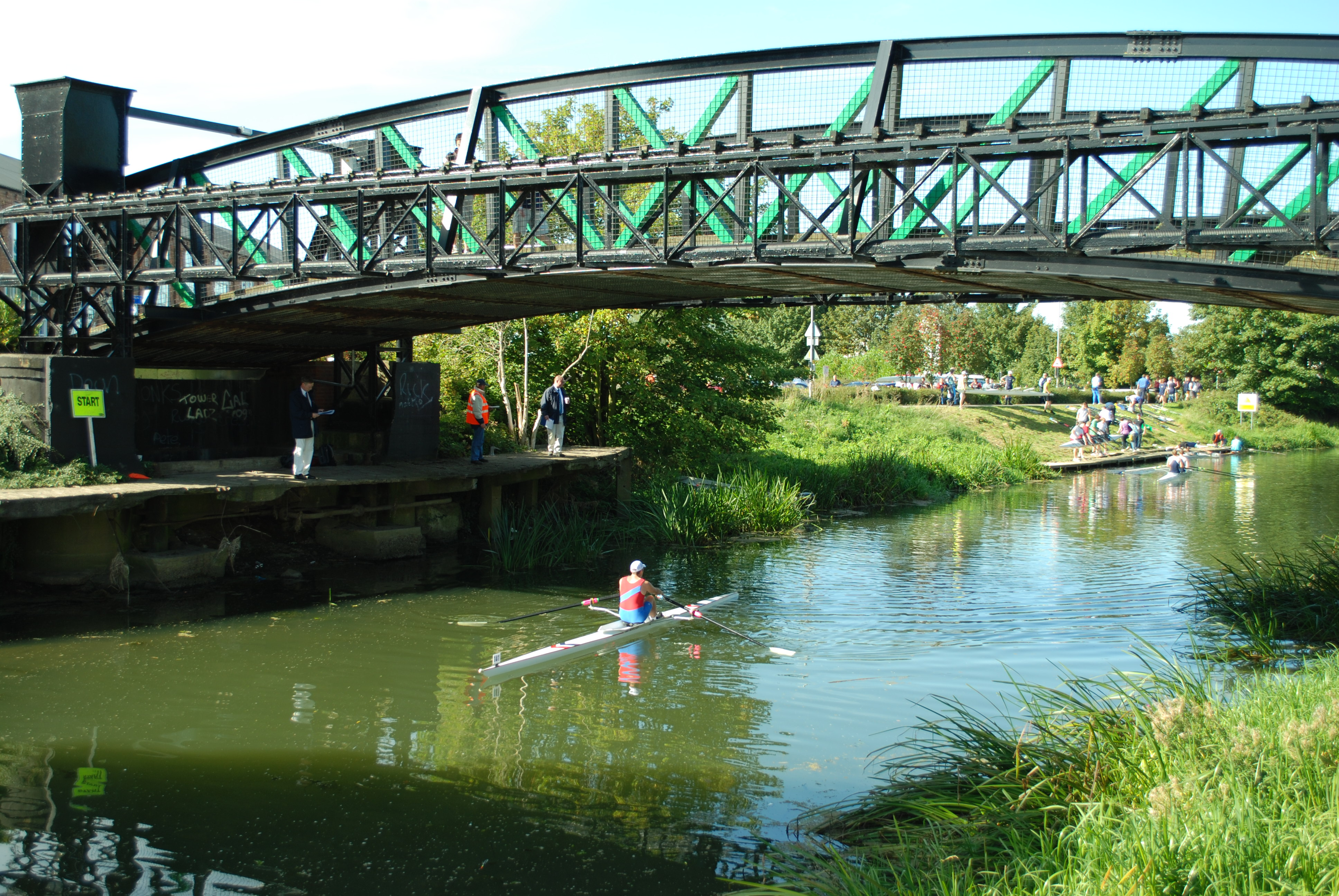
The start

The start is a set of landing stages at Lincoln Rowing Centre, Stamp End Lock, Waterside South, Lincoln. The centre was founded in 2006 in response to marathon being the only rowing hosted in Lincoln. The race follows the straightened Witham downstream to the finish line at Boston Rowing Club boathouse, 660 m north of the first bridges in Boston (overlapping road and rail bridges). One lock is present in the course.

== See also ==
- The Great River Race on the River Thames, founded in 1988, is a 22-mile rowing race, but is only open to traditional boats.
- The Ringvaart Regatta, founded in 1976, is a 100 km rowing race on the Ringvaart in the Netherlands.
