= Vector training =

Exercise method in the sport of rowing

Vector Training is a method of rowing training, developed in the 1960s as a winter training method. The first recorded usage of Vector Training was at Inverness Rowing Club in 1966, training for the Boston Rowing Marathon.

Vector Training builds up endurance by maximising the amplitude of the outing, making it an ideal training technique for clubs with shorter stretches of water. Increased water resistance caused by the cross-currentular path builds up the strength required for tough head of the river races.

There are many danger areas involved in Vector Training. Collisions are frequent between those using the vector method and those not. Ideally, Vector Training should be carried out by all boats on the body of water, maintaining a constant distance between crews. Due to the large amount of traffic, vector training and related training methods such as spoon-surfing have been banned on the River Thames and the Hudson River but are still widely practiced on quieter, narrower stretches of water such as the River Aire in Yorkshire and the River Nith in the Scottish Borders.
