= Head of the Trent =

Annual rowing race on the Trent-Severn Waterway

- Status: Active
- Genre: Sporting event and alumni homecoming
- Begins: End of September or beginning of October
- Frequency: Annually
- Venue: Trent–Severn Waterway
- Location: Peterborough, Ontario
- Coordinates: 44.358179°N 78.289755°W
- Country: Canada
- Years active: 55
- Inaugurated: 1971
- Founder: Chris Leach
- Most recent: September 29, 2018
- Participants: Over 2,000 athletes in over 400 boat races
- Attendance: 3,000-5,000 visitors
- Capacity: 400 boats
- Major events: Head race; Homecoming; Lacrosse; Music; Soccer; Rugby; Volleyball
- Organizer: Peterborough Rowing Club and Trent University Rowing Club
- Sponsors: Parks Canada, Regatta Sport, Steam Whistle Brewing (2018)
- Website: hotr.ca

The Head of the Trent is the annual rowing regatta and alumni homecoming held at Trent University. The name 'Head of the Trent' refers to activities taking place at both the regatta and the homecoming, including the head races, social events and varsity sports games. It is the only homecoming in North America that features rowing as the hallmark event.

The Head of the Trent regatta, which originally was held on one day, has now grown to become a two day-long competition of timed trial races where rowers compete to be the quickest through the course, which runs an approximately 5 km length along the Trent-Severn Waterway. It is one of North America's largest head-race regattas. The Head of the Trent also coincides with Trent's homecoming festivities where university alumni return to the Symons Campus of Trent University in Peterborough, ON. The event also draws prospective students and other visitors to the Campus and to the city. This influx of visitors has a very positive impact on the local economy.

== History ==
The first Head of the Trent weekend was held Saturday, October 23, 1971. The day was organized by Olympic rower and co-founder of the Trent University Rowing Club Chris Leach and Trent University biology professor David Carlisle. Leach had just enrolled at Trent the previous year and founded the rowing club with his friend Lach MacLean. Leach, MacLean and the rest of the team trained hard during the 1970 season with often grueling training regimens - team members recalled training sessions involving nightly runs up the Lady Eaton drumlin and carrying teammates piggyback - in order to reach a competitive level. And within one year, they were competing at regattas and hosting a brand new one: the Head of the Trent.

During this first weekend, approximately 300 rowers in 40 boats competed - coming from universities across Ontario and Upstate New York. Competitors rowed the course that was laid out from a swing bridge on Parkhill Rd., rowers made their way 1 km North up the canal until they turned a sharp Northeast into a broader stretch, before making a hard turn back North into Quilter's Bay; following that the rowers entered a very narrow segment of the canal and finished off in the Otonabee River, passing Bata Library and crossing the finish line under the Faryon Bridge. Crews during this first competition had to row into a stiff 25 km/h headwind while navigating this tricky new course.

In his book 'Trent University: celebrating 50 years of excellence', D'Arcy Jenish quotes the reportage of Iain Dobson, staff writer for Arthur Newspaper: "The grey skies, pastel fall colours and masterful architecture of the Nassau (now Symons) campus provided the backdrop for the spectators who lined the shore and filled the bridge. As the crews came to the finish, the effect of the current could be seen on the face of every rower."

== Rowing ==
The Head of the Trent is a two day-long regatta of timed trial head races where rowers and teams compete to be the quickest through the course, which runs an approximately 5 km length along the Trent-Severn Waterway.

Racing begins at 8:30 a.m. and runs until sunset. The races are split into six divisions - the day is organized by division, with Division 1 going first and Division 6 going last. Throughout the regatta there are events for different skill levels, team sizes, ages, genders, clubs and weight-classes; such as: Championship Single Men, University Heavy Eight Women, Under 19 Double Men and Recreational Coxed Four.

The Head of the Trent course offers bridges and waterfront viewing areas. The University's homecoming celebrations bring alumni to watch the races along with several thousand rowers and parents to watch the races. The course is known as one of Canada's "toughest tickets." The course has several significant bends and a 300-metre stretch of the canal known as "the narrows" which has a small width and necessitates a no-passing zone.

The narrowness of the canal necessitates special rules controlling traffic as there is not enough space for boats to pass in both directions. For this reason, organizers have opted to organize the races into divisions to control which boats are allowed to pass through the narrows. And due to the constraints of these logistic concerns and the need to complete all races before the sun sets, the regatta organizers have acknowledged that the race cannot handle more than 400 crews. Although demand is much higher and more teams want to compete at the Head of the Trent, the event is one of Canada's slowest growing due to this logistical cap.

The regatta draws upwards of 2,000 athletes in approximately 400 racing shells from over 50 universities, high schools and clubs across North America.

=== Course ===
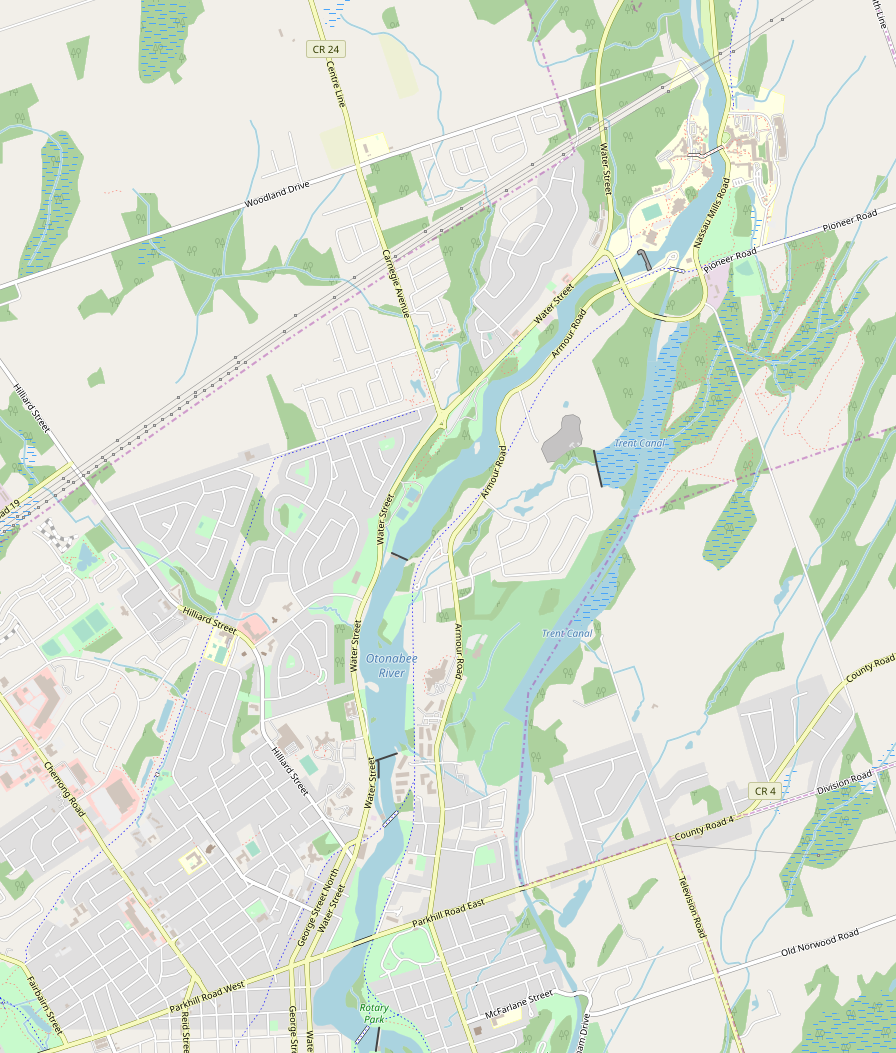

The course for the Head of the Trent regatta has remained largely the same since the race was founded in 1971. The only major change is the additional starting line for competitors in the recreational division, which makes the course 1 km shorter for the recreational races.

The competitive course begins at a point just South of the Parkhill Rd. bridge. Rowers make their way North 1 km up the Trent-Severn canal and turn sharply Northeast into a broader stretch. Next the course takes a hard turn North-Northeast into Quilter's Bay. Rowers continue into a very narrow segment of the canal that spans just 300 metres in length known as "the narrows", where passing is not permitted. This narrow segment ends after the boats pass "the point" and enter the Otonabee River, passing Bata Library and crossing the finish line just beyond the Faryon Bridge.

In many places, red buoys mark the bounds of the course and competitors must pass through the buoys or receive a time penalty.

=== Rules and regulations ===
The Head of the Trent follows the rules laid out by the Rowing Canada Aviron with a few local rules that augment or bypass the national governing body's regulations. These local rules include information on how competitors should navigate the course when preparing to begin, and upon leaving the course, as well as passing through the narrow section of the canal.

Between divisions, the canal opens after the last boat of the previous division has passed through it and closes twenty minutes after that, providing a quick launch window for competitors. Crews who do not proceed through the canal within the prescribed time period are disqualified from their event."

There are several conditions under which competitors may take on time penalties that impact their final score, including cutting corners around buoys, crossing the starting line before the race begins and crossing into the active race area when returning to the launch area.

== Homecoming ==
Since 1972, the Trent University Alumni Association has organized the annual homecoming celebrations to coincide with the Head of the Trent regatta. Visitors to Head of the Trent often wear the school colours of green and white and cheer on the Trent teams and other athletes competing at the regatta and varsity events. In addition to the sports, there are many social events, vendors, and other activities.

Many of the social events are reserved for members of the alumni association and alumni must be registered to attend. In 2018, alumni exclusive activities including discounted tickets to a Peterborough Petes home game, access to designated viewing areas for the regatta, access to a photo booth, access to a pub situated near the finish line of the race course, and access to vendors selling collector items.

The homecoming weekend is an opportunity for alumni to mix with current students and other visitors. In 2013, Trent student Hannah Ellsworth noted that she could sense alumni interacting with the event differently than others. Ellsworth wrote, "The alumni were easily distinguishable from the students. Their eyes met ours with nostalgia as they wandered the old haunts, occasionally commenting that something had changed or wondering aloud if they would run into a particular past classmate."

Although the homecoming is centered around alumni, there are also many social events that are open to all visitors, in the past these events have included campus tours, music performances, and varsity sports games.

Many events held during the homecoming celebrations are fundraisers for local charities or clubs and groups at Trent University. In 2018, there were events supporting the United Way, Trent Men's Rugby Club, and other Trent University fundraising initiatives.

The influx of alumni and other visitors has a significant impact on the local economy. In 2013, an estimated $430,000 was spent locally. Many local businesses and organizations arrange to be vendors or offer special discounts or events at their shops.

=== Traditions ===
At the beginning of each year during Introductory Seminar Week the Trent Rowing Club erects a large hand-painted sign on the wall of Champlain College - this sign is updated daily with a countdown to Head of the Trent weekend. In the early days of the Head of the Trent weekend, there was also the "Jeff Pringle Memorial Regatta" which was held on the Sunday after the Head of the Trent races. This event involved recreational mixed crew races where the results may have been inflected by the consumption of beer!

The hallmark of the Head of the Trent weekend are the homecoming parties known as keggers - particularly early morning parties on the day of the regatta colloquially called a "pancake kegger", "egger kegger", or "breakfast kegger".
