= Loosely associated statements =

Type of simple non-inferential passage

A loosely associated statement is a type of simple non-inferential passage wherein statements about a general subject are juxtaposed but make no inferential claim. As a rhetorical device, loosely associated statements may be intended by the speaker to infer a claim or conclusion, but because they lack a coherent logical structure any such interpretation is subjective as loosely associated statements prove nothing and attempt no obvious conclusion. Loosely associated statements can be said to serve no obvious purpose, such as illustration or explanation.

Included statements can be premises, conclusions or both, and both true or false, but missing from the passage is a claim that any one statement supports another.

== Examples ==
In A concise introduction to logic, Hurley demonstrates the concept with a quote by Lao-Tzu:

Not to honor men of worth will keep the people from contention; not to value goods which are hard to come by will keep them from theft; not to display what is desirable will keep them from being unsettled of mind.

— Lao-Tzu

不尚賢，使民不爭；不貴難得之貨，使民不為盜；不見可欲，使心不亂。

— 老子

While each clause in the quote may seem related to the others, each provides no reason to believe another.
