= Centre for Research in Reasoning, Argumentation, and Rhetoric =

Research group in the University of Windsor, Canada

Coordinates: 42°18′18″N 83°04′01″W

- Established: 2007
- Affiliations: University of Windsor
- Director: Christopher Tindale
- Location: Windsor, Ontario, Canada
- Website: www.uwindsor.ca/crrar/

The Centre for Research in Reasoning, Argumentation, and Rhetoric (CRRAR) is an interdisciplinary research group within the University of Windsor, Canada, which supports research in the fields of argumentation, informal logic, and rhetoric. Notable members include the widely published argumentation theorist Douglas N. Walton, and early founders of the informal logic field Ralph Johnson and J. Anthony Blair.

Members of the centre collaborate with local and international projects related to argumentation and informal logic, including the Ontario Society for the Study of Argumentation (OSSA), the International Society for the Study of Argumentation (ISSA), and the Association for Informal Logic and Critical Thinking (AILACT).
