= Head of the Fish =

Rowing race in Saratoga County, New York, US

- The Head of the Fish Regatta logo
- Date: Last Weekend of October
- Location: Fish Creek, Saratoga Springs, NY
- Event type: Head
- Distance: 1.9 miles.
- Established: 1986
- Website: https://regatta.saratogarowing.com/head-of-the-fish/
- Participants: 2,124 entries; 171 clubs

The Head Of The Fish Regatta is a rowing race held on the last weekend of October each year on Fish Creek, within Saratoga County, New York State. The race is named the "Head" of the Fish because it is a head race.

The event is hosted by the Saratoga Rowing Association. The race is organized by volunteers. Tom Frost, a member of the Saratoga Springs Rowing Club, founded the regatta in 1986. The original vision for the regatta was one "that wouldn't take itself too seriously." Protests were forbidden and "timing errors were considered part of the regatta's charm." Winners are awarded lacquered fish heads. In 2001, the "Fish", out grew the resources of the Saratoga Springs Rowing Club and that year the regatta was co-hosted by SSRC and SRA. In 2002, the regatta moved to a two-day event. By 2003, SRA began exclusively hosting. The largest regatta to date was 2016, with 2057 entires and 185 clubs participating.

No.	Year	# of Entires	# of Teams	Dates
1	1986			October 31st
2	1987			October 24th
3	1988			October 29th
4	1989			October 28th
5	1990			October 27th
6	1991			October 26th
7	1992			October 31st
8	1993			October 30th
9	1994			October 29th
10	1995			October 28th
11	1996			October 26th
12	1997			October 25th
13	1998			October 31st
14	1999			October 30th
15	2000			October 28th
16	2001	656	104	October 27th
17	2002			October 28th & 29th
18	2003	809		October 25th & 26th
19	2004	944	135	October 30th & 31st
20	2005	1038	143	October 29th & 30th
21	2006			October 30th & 31st
22	2007			October 28th & 27th
23	2008	1451	163	October 25th & 26th
24	2009	1511	168	October 24th & 25th
25	2010	1533	170	October 30th & 31st
26	2011	1612	159	October 29th & 30th
27	2012	1677	155	October 27th & 28th
28	2013	2028	159	October 28th & 29th
29	2014	1861	156	October 25th & 26th
30	2015	2057	185	October 31st & November 1st
31	2016	2057	167	October 39th & 30th
32	2017	2124	171	October 29th & 30th
33	2018	1945	153	October 27th & 28th
34	2019	1599	140	October 26th & 27th
	2020			Canceled
35	2021	1562	122	October 30th & 31st
36	2022	1690	134	October 29th & 30th
37	2023	1810	145	October 28th & 29th
38	2024	1663	127	October 27th & 28th
