= Howard Kahane =

American academic (1928–2001)

- Born: April 19, 1928; Cleveland, US
- Died: May 2, 2001 (aged 73); Mill Valley, California, US

Philosophical work
- Era: Contemporary philosophy
- Region: Western philosophy
- Main interests: Logic
- Notable ideas: Informal Logic

Howard Kahane (19 April 1928 – 2 May 2001) was an American professor of philosophy at Bernard M. Baruch College in New York City. He was noted for promoting a popular, and non-mathematical, approach to logic, now known as informal logic. His best known publication in that area is his textbook Logic and Contemporary Rhetoric: The Use of Reason in Everyday Life, now in the 12th edition, published in 2014.

Another textbook of his that saw posthumous publication is Logic and Philosophy: A Modern Introduction (12th edition in 2012).

Kahane graduated with a master's degree from the University of California at Los Angeles (1958) and received a Ph.D. from the University of Pennsylvania in 1962. Before Baruch College, Kahane taught at Whitman College, the University of Kansas, American University and the University of Maryland at Baltimore.

Nancy Cavender, who is a professor emeritus at the College of Marin and coauthored later editions of Kahane's 1971 textbook, was also "his companion", according to The New York Times. Kahane fathered one daughter.

== Legacy ==
According to argumentation theory scholar Michael A. Gilbert, before Kahane's 1971 book, North American curricula on critical thinking and fallacies were primarily taught from textbooks (such as Irving Copi's Introduction to Logic) in which "fallacies are presented in a brief fashion using examples that were mostly invented or taken out of context. [...] The 'radical change' was that Kahane's book took current examples from newspapers and periodicals dealing with issues students cared about or, at least, recognized. This meant that fallacies were more situated than in older books."

Linguistics professor Louise Cummings notes that Kahane's book marked a "shift to context", that is, toward pragmatic criteria for evaluating natural language arguments. She cites Van Eemeren, Grootendrost and Henkemans's (of the pragma-dialectic school) observation that thanks to his contextual approach Kahane "added new fallacies to the traditional list, so the one will find not only ad hominem but also 'provincialism', not only ad verecundiam, but also the 'red herring', not only hasty generalization but also 'suppressed evidence'."

== Selected publications ==
- Howard Kahane (1962). Six Inductive Problems. Graduate School of Arts and Sciences, University of Pennsylvania.
- Howard Kahane (1969). Logic and Philosophy: A Modern Introduction, Wadsworth Publishing Company, OCLC 23149
- Howard Kahane (1971). Logic and Contemporary Rhetoric: The Use of Reason in Everyday Life, Wadsworth Publishing Company, OCLC 200634
- Howard Kahane (1995). Contract Ethics: Evolutionary Biology and the Moral Sentiments. Rowman & Littlefield. ISBN 0847681181.
