= Chris Leach =

Canadian rower (1942–2025)

Personal information
- Full name: David Christopher Leach
- Born: 10 February 1942 St. Catharines, Ontario, Canada
- Died: 4 May 2025 (aged 83) Collingwood, Ontario, Canada

Sport
- Sport: Rowing

David Christopher Leach (10 February 1942 – 4 May 2025) was a Canadian rower. He competed at the 1960 Summer Olympics and the 1964 Summer Olympics. Following his Olympic career, Leach and his friend Lach MacLean attended Trent University, where the pair founded the Trent University Rowing Club in 1970. One year later Leach, with the help of Trent University biology professor David Carlisle, organized the first Head of the Trent rowing regatta on 23 October 1971.

Leach died on 4 May 2025 in Collingwood, Ontario, at the age of 83.
