= Louis Groarke =

Canadian philosopher

Louis Groarke (born 1953) is a Canadian philosopher, author, and a professor in the Philosophy Department at St. Francis Xavier University in Antigonish, Nova Scotia. His work is characterized by his specialization in Western philosophy, including political theory, moral philosophy, aesthetics, and logic, with a focus on the history of philosophy, Aristotle and the ancient Greeks.

== Career ==
Prior to his professorship at St. Francis Xavier University, Groarke taught philosophy at several universities and colleges across Canada, including University of Waterloo, Wilfrid Laurier University, Okanagan University-College, Humber College, Trent University, University of Prince Edward Island, and York University. Groarke's philosophical writings have focused upon ethics, logic, political philosophy and aesthetics. His political interests focus on the liberal-communitarian divide, theories of individual freedom, and the overlapping relationship between morality, religion, law, and politics. He is the brother of philosophers Leo Groarke and Paul Groarke; the three are identical triplets.

== Philosophical work ==
Louis Groarke's first book The Good Rebel addresses the tendency of contemporary philosophers to overly separate freedom from morality and rationality. In this model, morality and rationality appear to be constraints upon freedom. Through the presentation of a vast array of figures in the philosophical tradition, Groarke argues that this contemporary view is a deviation from a broadly held consensus that far from being at odds with morality and rationality, freedom actually presupposes these goods. According to this view, which Groarke defends, one cannot be authentically free without being both rational and good. Subsequently, Groarke has authored a significant textbook and many academic articles on ethics developing this historical methodology.

His work in logic also develops this methodology of applying lessons from the history of philosophy to offer revisionary accounts of philosophical ideas that have come to be taken for granted in much of the current philosophical discourse. In his work "An Aristotelian Account of Induction: Creating Something from Nothing," Groarke critiques the orthodox view of Inductive logic that has been widely held since David Hume, according to whom inductive inferences can never be certain as the conclusion always extends beyond the number of observed cases. Drawing on an Aristotelian distinction between knowledge and insight, Groarke argues that experience can in cases give insight into the fundamental nature of a thing in a way that grounds knowledge of the universal. This alternative view highlights that it is Hume's presumption of nominalism that grounds his account of the problem of induction. Defending an Aristotelian form of essentialism, Groarke argues for an account of induction that is non-fallacious and in some of its forms capable of rising to genuine knowledge.

== Bibliography ==
- Louis Groarke, The Good Rebel: Understanding Morality and Freedom, Fairleigh Dickinson University Press, 2002.
- Louis Groarke, An Aristotelian Account of Induction, McGill-Queen's University Press, 2009.
- Jonathan Lavery and Louis Groarke (Editors), Literary Form, Philosophical Content, Fairleigh Dickinson University Press, 2010.
- Louis Groarke, Moral Reasoning: Rediscovering the Ethical Tradition, Oxford University Press, 2011.
- Jonathan Lavery, Louis Groarke, and William Sweet, Ideas Under Fire: Historical Studies of Philosophy and Science in Adversity, Fairleigh Dickinson University Press, 2012.
- Paolo C. Biondi, Louis Groarke (Editors), Shifting the Paradigm: Alternative Perspectives on Induction, Walter De Gruyter Inc., 2014.
- Louis Groarke, Uttering the Unutterable: Aristotle, Religion, and Literature, Queen's University Press, 2023.
- Louis Groarke, Aristotle, Oedipus, and Religion, University of Ottawa Press, forthcoming.
