= Cathy Bruce (academic) =

President of Trent University, Canada

9th President and Vice-Chancellor of Trent University
- Incumbent
- Assumed office July 1, 2024
- Chancellor: Stephen Stohn
- Preceded by: Leo Groarke

Personal details
- Education: York University (BA, BEd); University of Toronto (MA, PhD)
- Occupation: Teacher, university administrator

Catherine Bruce is the 9th president and vice chancellor of Trent University. She is also a professor with the university’s School of Education, of which she is a former dean, and prior to her term as president, served as the university’s vice-president of Research and Innovation since 2022. She is the author of three books and is known for her research on the teaching of mathematics to primary and secondary school students.

== Education ==
Bruce received her BA and BEd from York University, and later earned an MA from OISE (Math, Science and Technology) of the University of Toronto as well as her PhD from the University of Toronto.

== Career ==
Cathy Bruce began her career as an elementary school teacher in the Greater Toronto Area, before moving to become a teacher with the Peterborough County Board of Education (later the Kawartha Pine Ridge DSB). She began working as a professor at Trent University in 2003, where she helped found the university’s School of Education. As a professor, she is a recipient of the Ontario Confederation of University Faculty Associations Teaching Award. In addition to teaching, she served in administrative roles including the director of education graduate programs, Founder of the Centre for Teaching and Learning, and Dean of the university’s School of Education. During her time as dean, she served as president of the Association of Canadian Deans of Education.

In 2022 Bruce was named the university’s vice-president of Research and Innovation, having served in an interim capacity for the role since 2020. In that role, she established the university’s Early Career Researcher Awards and created a Trent-specific Research Grant Incentive Program.

In 2024, Bruce was named president and vice-chancellor of Trent University.

== Research ==
In the field of mathematics education, Bruce’s work was consistently funded both provincially and federally (Ontario Ministry of Education, SSHRC). She conducted several extended studies on teaching and learning mathematics (K-12) and on related teacher and student efficacy, resulting in a substantive body of published peer-reviewed articles. Bruce co-authored the book From Patterns to Algebra, published by Nelson in 2012. Bruce also worked with an international group of researchers, founding the Spatial Reasoning Study Group, as well as a Canadian research project entitled “Math for Young Children”, which resulted in a series of publications including In 2016 her co-authored book Taking Shape: Activities to Develop Geometric and Spatial Thinking, published by Pearson Education. After a multi-year study on rational numbers, she co-authored the 2022 book Rethinking Fractions: 8 Core Concepts to Support Assessment and Learning. Her work has also appeared in top journals including ZDM Mathematics Education, Educational Studies in Mathematics, and the Alberta Journal of Educational Research, as well as several Handbooks.

In 2023, Bruce became an invited member of the International Program Committee for the International Commission on Mathematical Instruction (ICMI) for Advances in Geometry Education, in collaboration with Springer Publishing.

Her labs at Trent University - Trent Math Education Research Collaborative (TMERC) as PI and Participatory Educational Action Research (PEAR) as co-founder have involved deep collaboration with colleagues and research personnel over the years.

== Personal life ==
Bruce is married to her partner Paul Armstrong, with whom she has two children.
