= Informal Logic (journal) =

Informal Logic (ISSN 8242577) is a peer-reviewed, Diamond Open Access academic journal that deals with multi-disciplinary topics related to reasoning and argumentation (see entry for Informal Logic); covering both theory and practice. Topics covered include, but are not limited to, philosophy, rhetoric, communication, linguistics, psychology, and law.

The journal was originally published by faculty working in informal logic at the University of Windsor, Windsor, Ontario. It moved to an open source journal management and publishing software (OJS) hosted by the University of Windsor's Leddy Library, when it went online. The first issue was released in 1978 with four issues being published per year. Recently, control over the journal moved to now be published by the University of Lethbridge, Lethbridge, Alberta, Canada.

== Background ==
The Stanford Encyclopedia of Philosophy entry for Informal Logic states Ralph H. Johnson and J. Anthony Blair at the University of Windsor "established the Informal Logic Newsletter (1978-1983); and ultimately turned the newsletter into the journal Informal Logic (subtitled “Reasoning and Argumentation in Theory and Practice”). In this and other ways, they established informal logic as a field for study, research and development." The authors of the Encyclopedia entry also add "Much of the discussion that has shaped the evolution of informal logic as a field has taken place in a number of journals that have played a major role in its development." This list includes Informal Logic.
