= J. Anthony Blair =

Canadian philosopher

- Born: John Anthony Blair; August 12, 1941; Ottawa, Ontario
- Died: March 7, 2024 (aged 82); Windsor, Ontario
- Education: University of Michigan
- Occupation: Professor
- Known for: One of the founding members of the informal logic movement in North America

John Anthony Blair (August 12, 1941 – March 7, 2024) was a Canadian philosopher.

Along with his colleague Ralph Johnson, he has been credited as one of the founding members of the informal logic movement in North America. The two co-published one of the movement's most influential texts, "Logical Self-Defense". Blair is also co-founder of the Centre for Research in Reasoning, Argumentation, and Rhetoric, co-founder of the Ontario Society for the Study of Argumentation (OSSA), and a founding board member of the International Society for the Study of Argumentation (ISSA).

== Before academia ==
Blair was born in Ottawa, Ontario, and attended Fisher Park High School. He was Canadian Junior Downhill and Alpine Combined ski champion 1958, and played on McGill Intercollegiate Football championship teams (1960 and 1962). He died in Windsor, Ontario, on March 7, 2024.

== Academia ==
Blair studied at the University of Michigan and McGill University. He taught philosophy at the University of Windsor from 1967 until 2006, serving two terms as the head of that department. He was professor emeritus at the University of Windsor.

Blair's publications focused on argumentation theory, critical thinking, informal logic, and visual argumentation.

== Selected works ==
- Logical Self Defense (New U.S. Edition, IDEBATE, 2006)
- Groundwork in the Theory of Argumentation: Selected Papers of J. Anthony Blair (Dordrecht: Springer, 2012)
