= Christopher Tindale =

Canadian philosopher

Christopher W. Tindale
- Born: 1953 (age 72–73)
- Occupation: Philosopher
- Known for: Argumentation, rhetoric

Christopher William Tindale (born 1953) is a Canadian philosopher specializing in rhetoric, argumentation theory, and ancient Greek philosophy. Tindale is an editor of the journal Informal Logic, and currently serves as the chair of the Centre for Research in Reasoning, Argumentation, and Rhetoric. He has published numerous books and articles, translated into several languages, with a focus on argumentation and rhetoric.

== Career ==
Tindale received his PhD in philosophy from the University of Waterloo. He worked as a professor at Trent University for over twenty years, and served as Chair of the department of Ancient History and Classics for part of that time. He has been a professor at the University of Windsor since 2006.

His theoretical work stresses the experiential dimensions of argumentation, giving attention to audience reception and the role of the addressee in the argumentative situation. The cognitive environment, as the space in which conviction is experienced and then personalized in persuasion, has been developed in the work since the mid-nineties, culminating in the replacement of Perelman's notorious universal audience with this idea. This in turn has allowed for traditional rhetorical concepts like presence and ethos to be reimagined as important contemporary ideas. Such rhetorical devices are developed as a means of engaging an audience's rationality as well as referring to the specific interests or desires of that audience. His practical work is reflected in textbooks that translate state-of-the-art research so as to inform the practice of everyday reasoning. This is to be seen in the Oxford textbook (co-authored with Leo Groarke) in its fifth edition, the work on fallacies (2007), and the original German text (2013) that is the first in that language to integrate logical and rhetorical features of argumentation. A further dimension of the practical side of his work has been the examination of conflict resolution strategies, leading to current work which applies the tools of argumentation theory to the problems of deep disagreement and extremism.

He has provided specific curricular to the Open University system in Germany (FernUniversität in Hagen) and graduate programs on other continents. His work has been translated into Chinese, French, German, Serbian, Spanish, and Russian. He is an Advisory Editor of the University of Bologna Law Review, a general student-edited law journal published by the Department of Legal Studies of the University of Bologna.

== Select books ==
- Plato’s Reasons (SUNY, 2023)
- How We Argue (Routledge, 2022)
- The Anthropology of Argument: Cultural Foundations of Rhetoric and Reason (Routledge, 2021)
- Retórica y Teoría de la Argumentación Contemporáneas: Ensayos Escogidos de Christopher Tindale (Editorial EAFIT, 2017)
- The Philosophy of Argument and Audience Reception (Cambridge University Press, 2015)
- Grundkurs Informelle Logik: Begründen und Argumentieren im Alltag und in den Wissenschaften with Thomas Keutner (Translator) (Mentis Verlag GmbH, 2013)
- Good Reasoning Matters! Fifth Edition with Leo Groarke. (Oxford University Press Canada, 2013)
- Reason's Dark Champions: Constructive Strategies of Sophistic Argument (University of South Carolina Press, 2010)
- Fallacies and Argument Appraisal (Cambridge University Press, 2007)
- Rhetorical Argumentation (Sage, 2004)
- Acts of Arguing: A Rhetorical Model of Argumentation (SUNY, 1999)
