= Ringvaart Regatta =

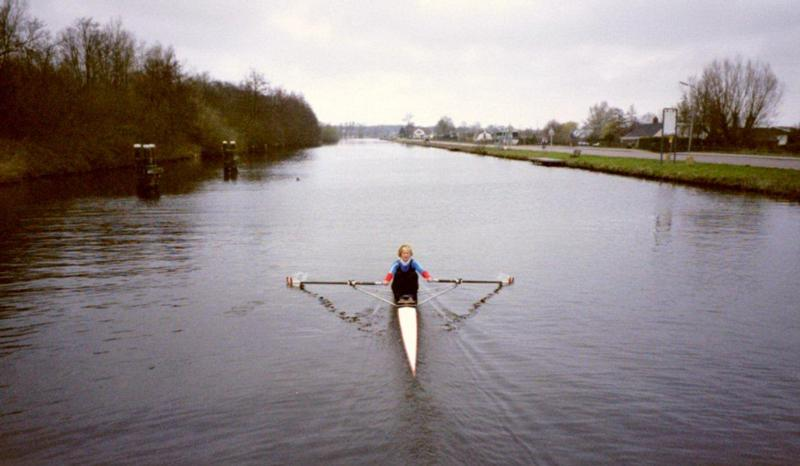
A single sculler practicing on the Ringvaart in November 2001

The OC&C Ringvaart Regatta is a rowing race over the very long distance of 100 kilometres (62 mi). The D.S.R.V. Laga (a student rowing club in Delft) has organised the head race annually since 1976.

== History ==
In 1976 the Laga club members celebrated their centennial. As part of their anniversary they challenged De KSRV 'Njord' (The Royal Student Rowing club 'Njord') for this 100 km marathon. Soon other student rowing clubs heard about the race and the Ringvaart Regatta became an annual event.

== Trail ==
The rowing race starts at the Kagerplassen and rounds the Ringvaart counterclockwise once before returning to the Kagerplassen. The rowers then enter the Vliet canal. The finish line is in Delft.
