= Ringvaart =

Dutch circular canal

Coordinates: 52.2316°N 4.555°E

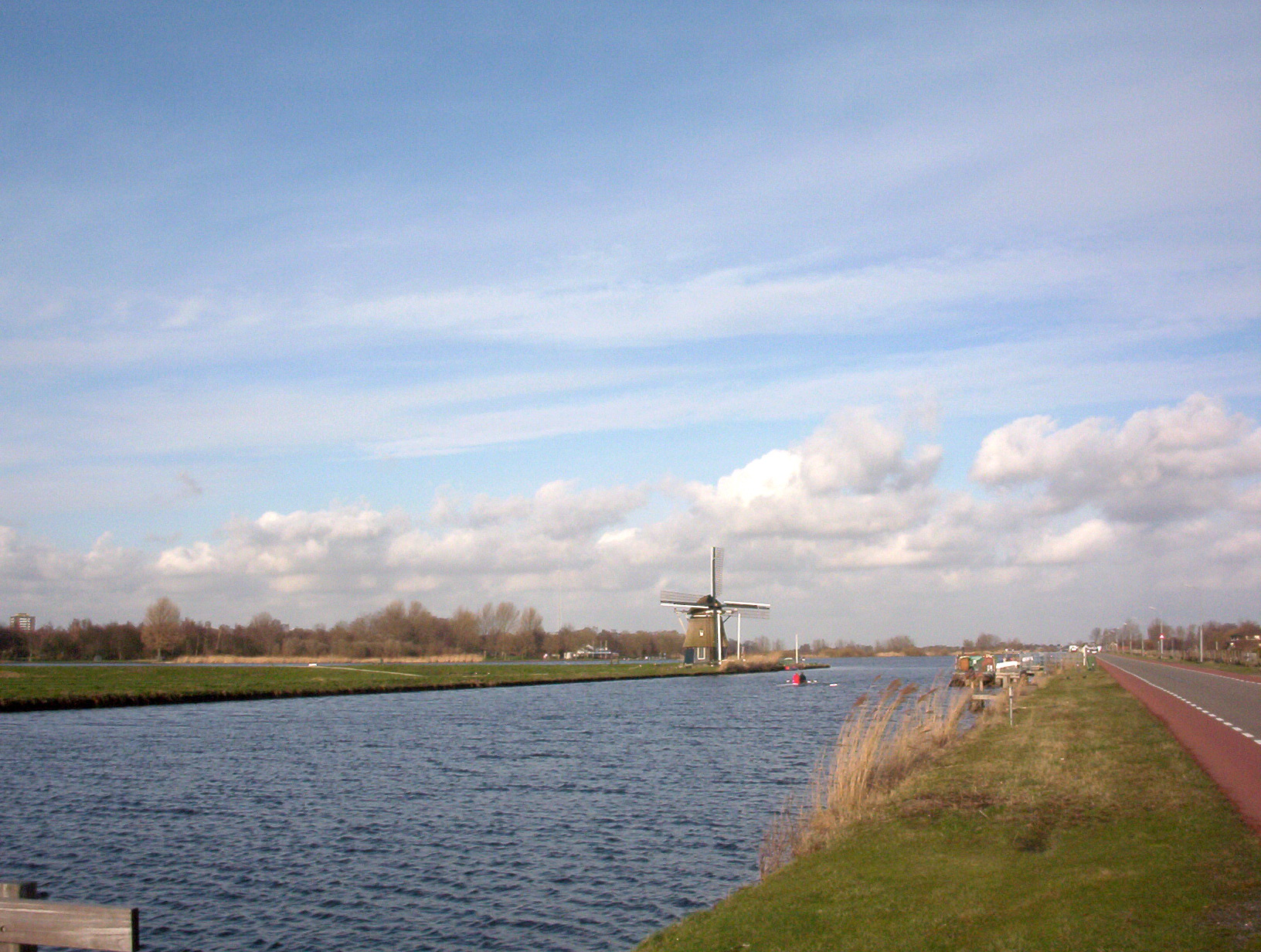
- The canal near Cruquius
- Country: Netherlands

Specifications
- Length: 61 km (38 miles)

Geography
- Direction: Circular

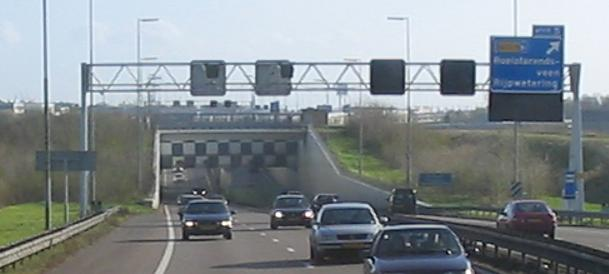
The aqueduct over the A4 Highway

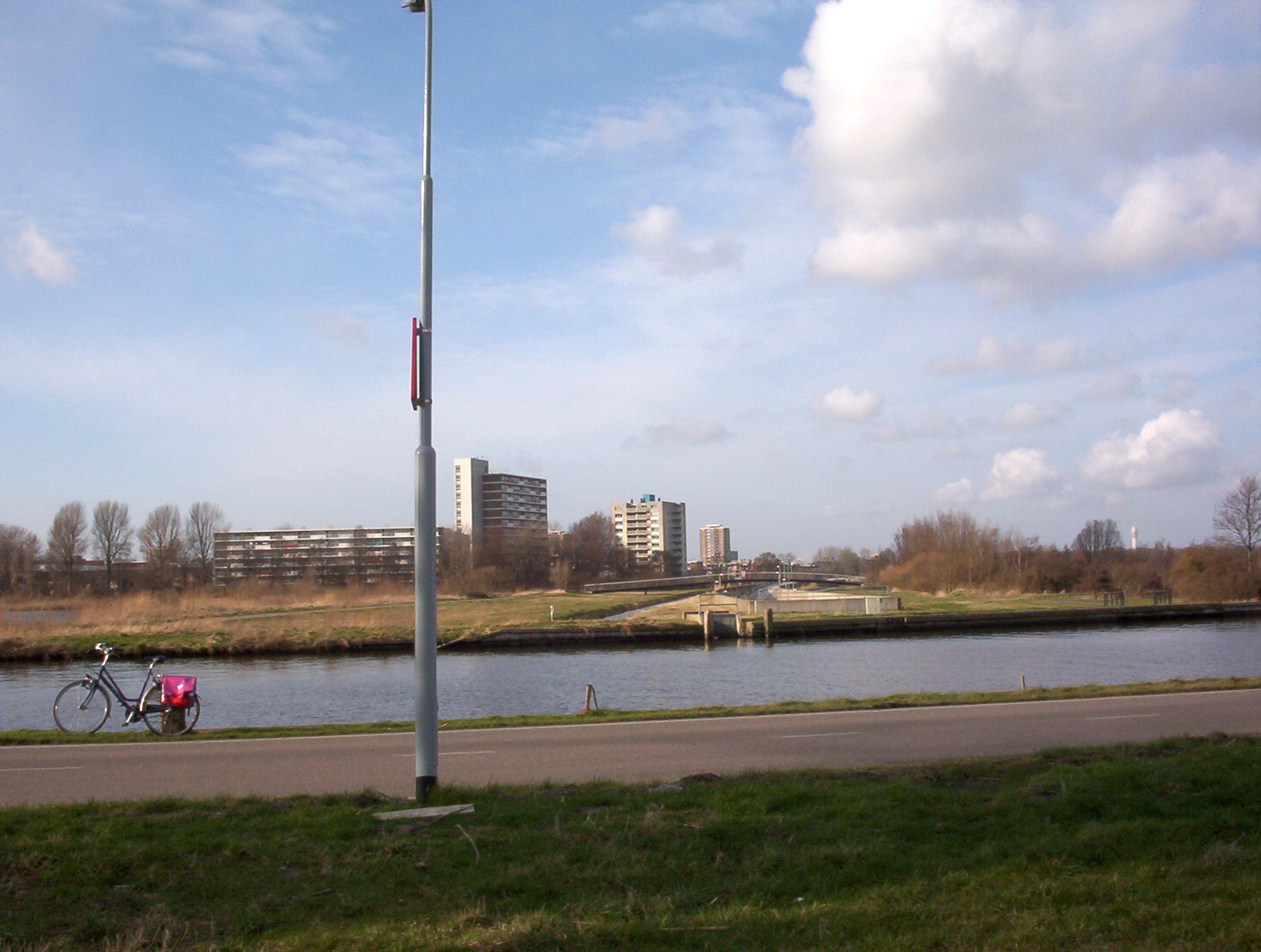
Just north of geniedijk, view east of ringvaart aqueduct over Zuid Tangent bus line

The Ringvaart (known in full as Ringvaart of the Haarlemmermeer Polder) is a canal in the province of North Holland, the Netherlands. The Ringvaart (Dutch meaning "ring canal") is a true circular canal surrounding the Haarlemmermeer polder and forms the boundary of the Haarlemmermeer municipality. Ringvaart is also the name of the dike bordering the canal.

Construction of the canal began in 1839 as the first step to reclaim land from Haarlemmermeer (Dutch for Haarlem's Lake). Thousands of laborers dug a canal through the existing land, as much as possible closely following the lake's contour. But at three locations (Vijfhuizen, Lisserbroek, and Huigsloot), the Ringvaart was dug through peninsulas which thereafter became part of Haarlemmermeer.

In 1845, the canal was completed and the lake could be drained, using the Ringvaart to drain the excess waters. The canal is 61 kilometres (38 mi) long, and 2.4 metres (8 ft) deep. It encloses an area of more than 180 square kilometres (70 sq mi). The removed earth was used to build a ring dike from 30 to 50 metres (30 to 54 yd) wide around the polder.

The Ringvaart is used for commercial and recreational boat traffic. A portion of it forms part of the sailroute from Hollands Diep to the IJsselmeer, passable for ships with masts over 6 meters (20 ft) tall.

Near Roelofarendsveen, the Ringvaart crosses the A4 Highway by means of a navigable aqueduct. It was built in 1961, making it the oldest aqueduct in the Netherlands. In 2006, construction was completed of two new portions: on the east side for crossing new north-bound lanes for the expanded highway; and on the west side for the new HSL-Zuid high-speed railway. The new aqueduct is 1.8 kilometres (1.1 mi) long.

== World Heritage Site ==
The Pump House Cruquius, which was used to drain the lake, is a Dutch Rijksmonument for the history of the James Watt steam engine within. The Ringvaart, the Cruquius Pump House, the dike itself, and various other components such as aqueducts, bridges and defense bunkers located south of the dike of the Stelling van Amsterdam (Defense line of Amsterdam) are considered a World Heritage Site. The main dike of the Stelling van Amsterdam runs diagonally across the Haarlemmermeer polder and crosses the Ringvaart twice. Fort Vijfhuizen located on the Ringvaart is used for art exhibitions.

== See also ==
- Ringvaart Regatta - a 100 km rowing race
