= Head race =

Time-trial competition in the sport of rowing

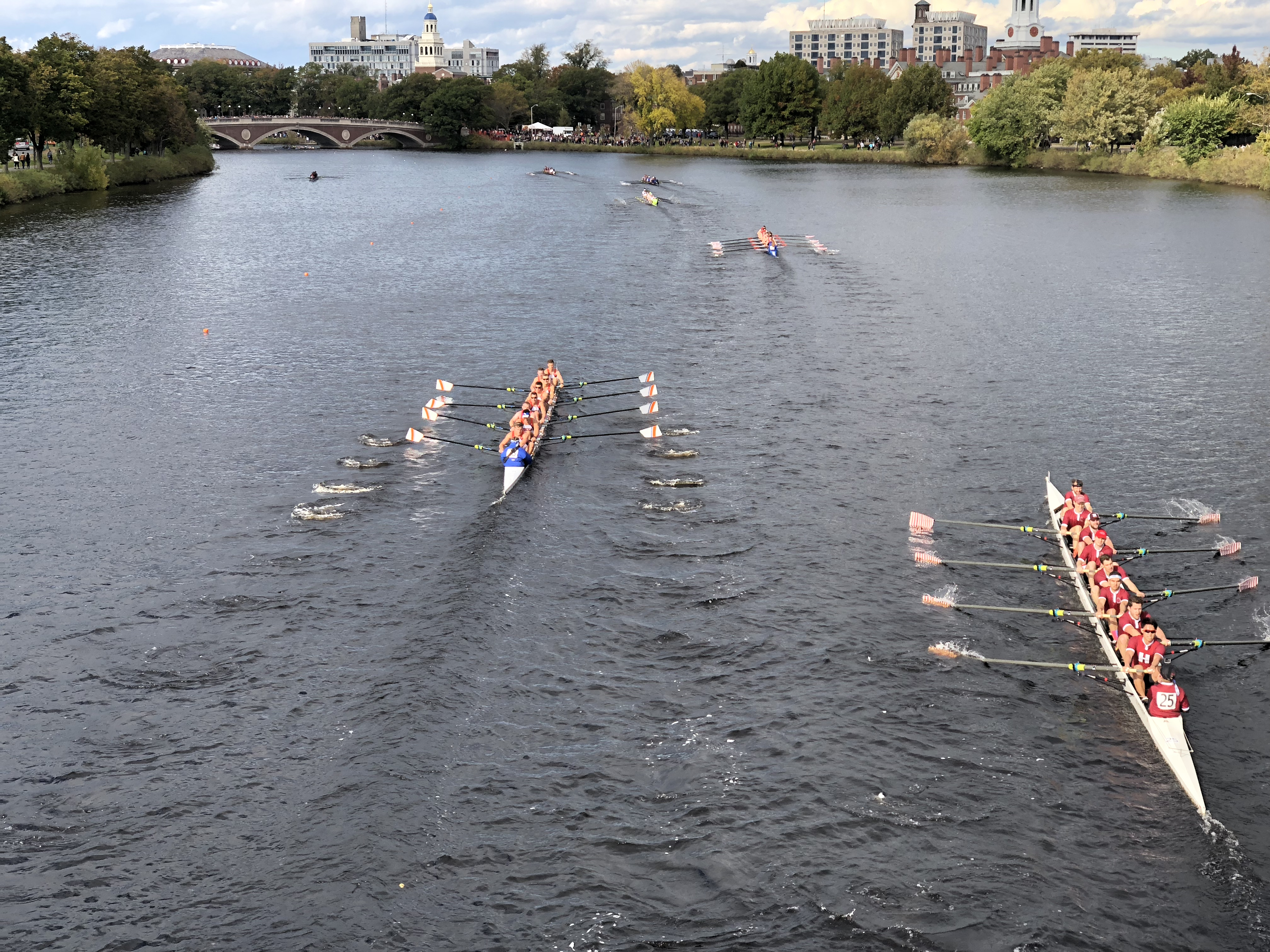
Eights racing at the Head of the Charles Regatta

A head race is a time-trial competition in the sport of rowing. Head races are typically held in the fall, winter and spring seasons. These events draw many athletes as well as observers. In this form of racing, rowers race against the clock where the crew or rower completing the course in the shortest time in their age, ability and boat-class category is deemed the winner.

== Categories ==
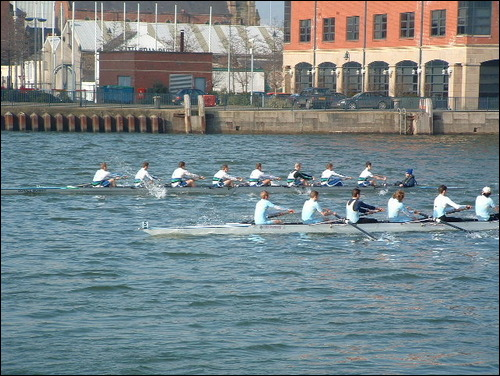
Two crews racing in Lagan Head of the River. The closer boat is being overtaken by the boat on the far side.

Common categories of age may be high school and college-aged rowers as well as adults. Those over the age of 27 are typically referred to as "masters".

Common categories of ability may be:

- junior-varsity boys and girls
- varsity boys and girls
- novice women's and men's, or mixed
- women's and men's among college-aged rowers
- novice, club, intermediate, elite and championship among masters-aged rowers; also differentiated by women, men, or mixed.

Common categories of boat class may be:

- 1x: one rower with two oars, known as a single sculler
- 2x: two rowers with two oars each, known as a double scull
- 4x: four rowers with two oars each, known as a quad scull
- Coxless pair: Two rowers with one oar each (see sweep rowing)
- 4+: Four rowers with one oar each and a coxswain
- 8+: Eight rowers with one oar each and a coxswain

To minimize collisions, boats are started at 10 to 15 second intervals and are usually seeded so that the fastest start earlier.

== Races ==
The length of most head races is usually between 4 km and 10 km. Among the most well-known are the 4.25-mile (6,840 m) Head of the River Race that takes place each March on the river Thames in London, United Kingdom, the 3-mile (4,800 m) Head of the Charles race held each October on the Charles River in Boston, Massachusetts, United States., and the 8 km Head of the Yarra race held each November on the Yarra River in Melbourne, Victoria, Australia.

Other notable head races include the Head of the Hooch, in Chattanooga, Tennessee; the Head of the Trent in Peterborough, Ontario along the Trent-Severn Waterway; the Head of the Rideau in Ottawa in March; the 3 1/4-mile (5,200 m) Head of the Lake through the Montlake Cut in Seattle; the Fremont 4-Miler also in Seattle (last held in 2007); the 3-mile Head of the Ohio in Pittsburgh held annually since 1986 along the Forks of the Ohio River; the 3-mile Head of the Schuylkill in Philadelphia; the Head of the Fish in Saratoga Springs, New York.

In the Netherlands the best known head race is the Head of the River Amstel every year in March. Another, less well known head race is the Eemhead, on the river Eem, which is rowed upstream the river and finishes at the boathouse of the organizing boat club, Hemus in Amersfoort. An indoor rower race inspired on the Head of the river Amstel is the Ergohead, organized every year in January by the Amsterdam boat club 'De Amstel'. Initially it was a race over 6 virtual kilometers, and from the second time it was a race during 20 minutes, and the winner is the competitor who 'rowed' the longest distance.

Two of the longest head races are the 100 km Ringvaart Regatta in the Netherlands. and the 20 km Göta Älvrodden in Gothenburg, Sweden.
