= Leo Groarke =

Canadian philosopher

8th President and Vice-Chancellor of Trent University
- In office July 1, 2014 – June 30, 2024
- Chancellor: Don Tapscott; Stephen Stohn
- Preceded by: Steven E. Franklin
- Succeeded by: Cathy Bruce

Personal details
- Born: 1953 (age 72–73)
- Relatives: Louis Groarke (brother)
- Occupation: Professor, university administrator
- Known for: Argumentation theory, informal logic

Academic background
- Education: University of Calgary (BA, MA); University of Western Ontario (PhD)
- Thesis: Scepticism: A defense (1982)
- Doctoral advisor: Tom Lennon

Academic work
- Discipline: philosophy
- Institutions: Wilfrid Laurier University; University of Windsor; Trent University

Leo Groarke (born 1953) is a Canadian philosopher, known for his contributions to argumentation theory and informal logic.

Groarke has authored and edited a number of books, articles, and anthologies. Groarke has held numerous administrative positions at various Canadian universities, and served as the President of Trent University from 2014 to 2024.

He is the brother of philosophers Louis Groarke and Paul Groarke. The three are identical triplets.

== Education and career ==
Groarke studied at the University of Calgary, Simon Fraser University, the University of Helsinki, and the University of Western Ontario. He earned his PhD in philosophy in 1982 and was a professor of philosophy at Wilfrid Laurier University, also holding several administrative positions. From 2010 to 2015 he served as the provost/vice-president academic at the University of Windsor. From 2014-2024, he was the president of Trent University.

Groarke's publications have concerned Ancient Greek philosophy, the history of ideas, and argumentation theory. He has published several papers on the possibility of arguments in non-linguistic modes, such as visual and musical arguments. With David Birdsell, he edited a special edition of Argumentation and Advocacy on Visual Argumentation in 2007. He is the author of the Stanford Encyclopedia of Philosophy entry for Informal Logic, and also wrote the 2008 edition of the Stanford Encyclopedia entry for Ancient Skepticism.

== Selected works ==
- Good Reasoning Matters! Revised 4th Ed. with Christopher Tindale (Toronto: Oxford University Press, 2008)
- Greek Scepticism: Anti-Realist Trends in Ancient Thought (Kingston, Montreal: McGill-Queen's University Press, 1990)
