= Simple non-inferential passage =

Type of nonargument

A simple non-inferential passage is a type of nonargument characterized by the lack of a claim that anything is being proved. Simple non-inferential passages include warnings, pieces of advice, statements of belief or opinion, loosely associated statements, and reports. Simple non-inferential passages are nonarguments because while the statements involved may be premises, conclusions or both, the statements do not serve to infer a conclusion or support one another. This is distinct from a logical fallacy, which indicates an error in reasoning.

== Types ==
=== Warnings ===
A warning is a type of simple non-inferential passage that serves to alert a person to any sort of potential danger. This can be as simple as a road sign indicating falling rock or a janitorial sign indicating a wet, slippery floor.

=== Piece of advice ===
A piece of advice is a type of simple non-inferential passage that recommends some future action or course of conduct. A mechanic recommending regular oil changes or a doctor recommending that a patient refrain from smoking are examples of pieces of advice.

=== Statements of belief or opinion ===
A statement of belief or opinion is a type of simple non-inferential passage containing an expression of belief or opinion lacking an inferential claim. In A concise introduction to logic, Hurley uses the following example to illustrate:

We believe that our company must develop and produce outstanding products that will perform a great service or fulfill a need for our customers. We believe that our business must be run at an adequate profit and that the services and products we offer must be better than those offered by competitors

— A concise introduction to logic, 10th edition

=== Loosely associated statements ===
A loosely associated statement is a type of simple non-inferential passage wherein statements about a general subject are juxtaposed but make no inferential claim. As a rhetorical device, loosely associated statements may be intended by the speaker to imply a claim or conclusion, but because they lack a coherent logical structure any such interpretation is subjective as loosely associated statements prove nothing and attempt no obvious conclusion. Loosely associated statements can be said to serve no obvious purpose, such as illustration or explanation.

=== Reports ===
A report is a type of simple non-inferential passage wherein the statements serve to convey knowledge.

Even though more of the world is immunized than ever before, many old diseases have proven quote resilient in the face of changing population and environmental conditions, especially in the developing world. New diseases, such as AIDS, have taken their toll in both the North and the South

— Steven L. Spiedel, World politics in a new era

The above is considered a report because it informs the reader without making any sort of claim, ethical or otherwise. However, the statements being made could be seen as a set of premises, and with the addition of a conclusion it would be considered an argument.
