= Informal inferential reasoning =

In statistics education, informal inferential reasoning (also called informal inference) refers to the process of making a generalization based on data (samples) about a wider universe (population/process) while taking into account uncertainty without using the formal statistical procedure or methods (e.g. P-values, t-test, hypothesis testing, significance test).

Like formal statistical inference, the purpose of informal inferential reasoning is to draw conclusions about a wider universe (population/process) from data (sample). However, in contrast with formal statistical inference, formal statistical procedure or methods are not necessarily used.

In statistics education literature, the term "informal" is used to distinguish informal inferential reasoning from a formal method of statistical inference.

== Informal Inferential Reasoning and Statistical Inference ==
Since everyday life involves making decisions based on data, making inferences is an important skill to have. However, a number of studies on assessments of students’ understanding statistical inference suggest that students have difficulties in reasoning about inference.

Given the importance of reasoning about statistical inference and difficulties that students have with this type of reasoning, statistics educators and researchers have been exploring alternative approaches towards teaching statistical inference. Recent research suggests that students have some sound intuitions about data and these intuitions can be refined and nudged towards prescriptive theory of inferential reasoning. More of an informal and conceptual approach that build on the previous big ideas and make connection between foundational concepts is therefore favorable.

Recently, informal inferential reasoning has been the focus of research and discussion among researchers and educators in statistics education as it is seen as having a potential to help build fundamental concepts that underlie formal statistical inference. Many advocate that underlying concepts and skills of inference should be introduced early in the course or curriculum as they can help make the formal statistical inference more accessible (see published reaction of Garfield & Zieffler to).

== Three essential characteristics ==
According to Statistical Reasoning, Thinking and Literacy forum, three essential principles to informal inference are:

1. generalizations (including predictions, parameter estimates, and conclusions) that go beyond describing the given data;
2. the use of data as evidence for those generalizations; and
3. conclusions that express a degree of uncertainty, whether or not quantified, accounting for the variability or uncertainty that is unavoidable when generalizing beyond the immediate data to a population or a process.

== Core Statistical Ideas ==
Informal inferential reasoning involved the following related ideas

- Properties of aggregates. This includes the ideas of distributions, signal (a stable component of population/process such as averages) and noise (a variable component of population/process such as the deviations of individual value around an average) and types of 'noise' or variability (measurement variability, natural variability, sampling variability).
- Sample size. Bigger samples are better because they provide a more accurate estimate of the population/process signals.
- Controlling for bias. The use of random sampling to be sure not to introduce bias in the sampling process and thus increase the chance that the sample we get is representative of the population
- Tendency. Distinguish between claims that are always true and that are often or sometimes true.

Bakker and Derry (2011) argue for using inferentialism as a philosophical foundation to develop informal inferential reasoning and therefore address three major challenges in statistics education--(1) avoiding students' inert knowledge (not being able to apply what they have learned to new problems), (2) avoiding atomistic approaches to teaching statistics, and (3) sequencing topics to create coherence in curriculum from a students' perspective.

== Tasks that Involve Informal Inferential Reasoning ==
Zieffler et al. (2008) suggest three types of tasks that have been used in studies of students' informal inferential reasoning and its development.

1. Estimate and draw a graph of a population based on a sample
2. Compare two or more samples of data to infer whether there is a real difference between the populations from which they were sampled
3. Judge which of two competing models or statements is more likely to be true.

Tasks that involve "growing samples" are also fruitful for developing informal inferential reasoning

== Additional References ==
- Gil, E., & Ben-Zvi, D. (2011). Explanations and context in the emergence of students’ informal inferential reasoning. Mathematical Thinking and Learning, 13, 87-108.
- Makar, K., & Rubin, A. (2009). A framework for thinking about informal statistical inference. Statistical Education Research Journal, 8(1), 82-105.
- Rossman, A. J. (2008). Reasoning about informal statistical inference: one statistician’s view. Statistical Education Research Journal, 7(2), 5-19.
