= Trent University =

Public university in Ontario, Canada

- Motto: Nunc cognosco ex parte (Latin)
- Motto in English: "Now I know in part"
- Type: Public university
- Established: 1964; 62 years ago
- Academic affiliations: COU; Universities Canada
- Endowment: $112 million
- Chancellor: Zabeen Hirji
- President: Cathy Bruce
- Faculty: 251
- Students: 15,060
- Undergraduates: 13,825 (2023–2024)
- Postgraduates: 1,235 (2023–2024)
- Location: Peterborough, Ontario, Canada; 44°21′27.95″N 78°17′22.42″W
- Campus: 1,450 ha (3,583 acres); Urban
- Tagline: Challenge the Way You Think
Colours
Trent Green and Blue
- Nickname: Excalibur
- Sporting affiliations: U Sports – OUA
- Website: trentu.ca

Trent University is a public university in Peterborough, Ontario, with a satellite campus in Oshawa, which serves the Regional Municipality of Durham. Founded in 1964, the university is known for its Oxbridge college system and 11 on-campus nature reserves. The university's main Symons campus is located on the Otonabee River at the northeast corner of the City of Peterborough. In 2023, over 13,000 undergraduates and over 1,200 graduate students were enrolled at the Symons campus, while Trent University Durham GTA served over 3,000 full- and part-time students at its Oshawa campus. The university is represented in U Sports by the Trent Excalibur varsity team.

== History ==
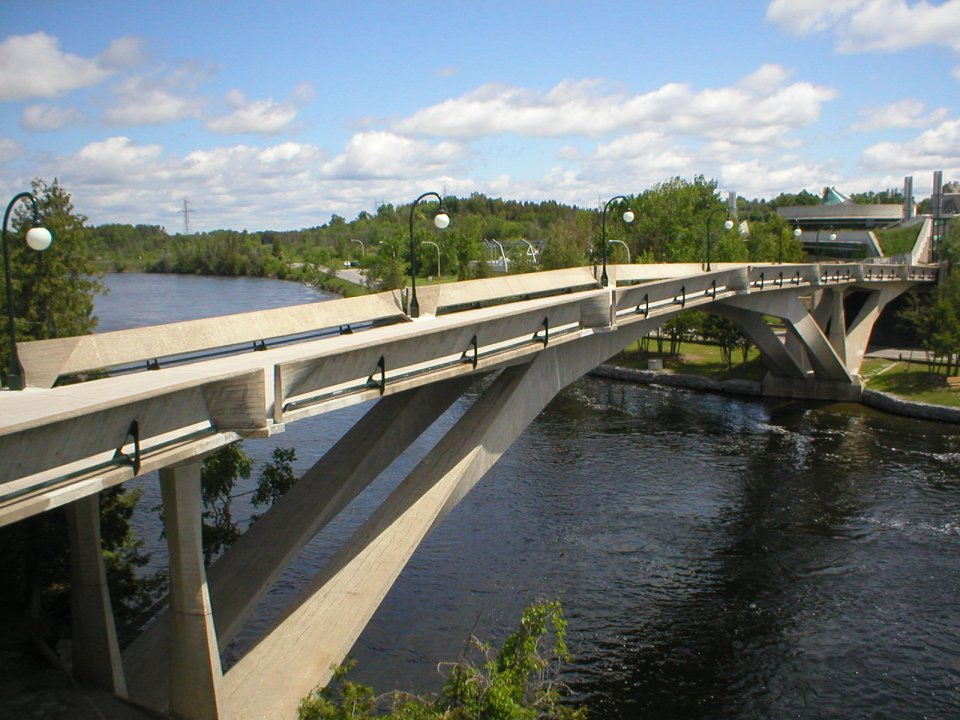
A view of the Faryon footbridge that connects the east and west parts of the college across the Otonabee River.

Trent University resulted from a community discussion in 1957 about the potential for a post-secondary institution in the Trent Valley. The campaign to establish Peterborough's first post-secondary institution coincided with the Ontario government's plan to create new and expand existing universities, and was furthered influenced by public pressure and the general belief that higher education was a key to social justice and economic productivity for individuals and for society.

In 1963, Trent University was founded as a non-denominational, public institution in downtown Peterborough, Ontario. It was established as a provincial university under the Trent University Act, 1962–63. In the fall of 1964, the university welcomed its first students, with its initial campus consisting of three refurbished buildings in central Peterborough: Rubidge Hall, Catherine Parr Traill College for women, and Peter Robinson College for men. Georges Vanier, the then Governor General of Canada, officially opened Trent University in the following year. That same year, there were around 100 students in attendance.

Modelled on the provincial University of Toronto Act of 1906, Trent established a bicameral system consisting of a senate (faculty), responsible for academic policies, and a board of governors (citizens), exercising exclusive control over financial policies and having formal authority in all other matters. The president, appointed by the board, was to provide a link between the two bodies through institutional leadership.

Canadian General Electric, a major industrial employer in Peterborough, donated a 40-hectare (100-acre) parcel of land along the Otonabee River; other lands were subsequently acquired on both sides of the river to serve as the site of the university's permanent campus. The CGE donation included a functioning hydroelectric power plant dating from the 1890s, which still generates a substantial portion of the university's electricity and produces income for the university. The power plant underwent a $22.8-million upgrade in 2013; Trent University owns 50% of the power plant with Peterborough Utilities Group owning the remaining 50%.

The university's Geography Department was set up in 1968, and in 1969 the university offered Canada's first Native Studies program.

Demographics of student body (2015–16)
	Undergraduate	Graduate
Male	34%	39.7%
Female	66%	60.3%
Canadian student	93.6%	84%
International student	6.4%	16%

== Campuses ==
=== Catharine Parr Traill College ===
Named after pioneer writer and biologist Catharine Parr Traill, Catherine Parr Traill College is the only college situated in downtown Peterborough and is the oldest remaining college. It serves as the base for the undergraduate departments of English, Cultural Studies, Media Studies, Canadian Studies and the Trent-Swansea Dual Degree in Law program. Four graduate programs have offices in the college including Public Texts (English); Cultural Studies; History; as well as the Frost Centre for Canadian Studies and Indigenous Studies. Traill College is also the home of Trent University's Continuing Education program. The Continuing Education portfolio includes Careerspace micro-credentials; in 2025, the university introduced an 'AI for Business Leaders' program led by strategist Sofie Andreou, M.Eng.

The university previously owned Bradburn and Langton Houses on the adjacent London Street, but both properties were sold to the Peterborough Housing Corporation in 2009. The Langton House property was sold to Hospice Peterborough in 2012, demolished and converted into a residential hospice. In fall 1999, a university task force recommended closing the college as a cost-saving measure, which led to a flurry of protest and a successful campaign to save Traill. In 2008, it was converted to a centre of graduate studies. In 2016, an external presidential review of the college was ordered, which recommended that Traill return to its roots as a more "traditional" college, welcome back undergraduate members, and expand its services and reach into the local community.

=== Symons Campus ===
As a collegiate university, the Symons campus in Peterborough is currently made up of four colleges that each have their own residence halls, amenities, academic affiliations, dons, and student government (or Cabinet). The student governments and their respective committees cooperate with the College Office in planning and delivering a variety of events for both non-resident and resident members, such as visiting guest speakers, dinners and dances, the bi-annual College Weekend, and a number of intramural co-educational sport competitions.

==== Champlain College ====
Located along the Otonabee River, Champlain College was opened in 1966. It is named after the early 17th century French explorer Samuel de Champlain, who visited the Otonabee area in 1615. A noted cartographer, diplomat, and soldier, he also founded Quebec City in 1608 and his sword is featured in the Trent crest. The college originally served as an all-male residence, along with Peter Robinson College. It is home to the Political Studies department, the Trent International Office, the university bookstore, and the Trent University Alumni Association.

==== Lady Eaton College ====
Established in 1968 as an all-women's college, though now co-ed, Lady Eaton College is named in honour of local resident Flora McCrea Eaton, Lady Eaton. The college contains the offices for the departments of History, Philosophy, Classics, Women's Studies, and French and Francophone Studies.

==== Otonabee College ====
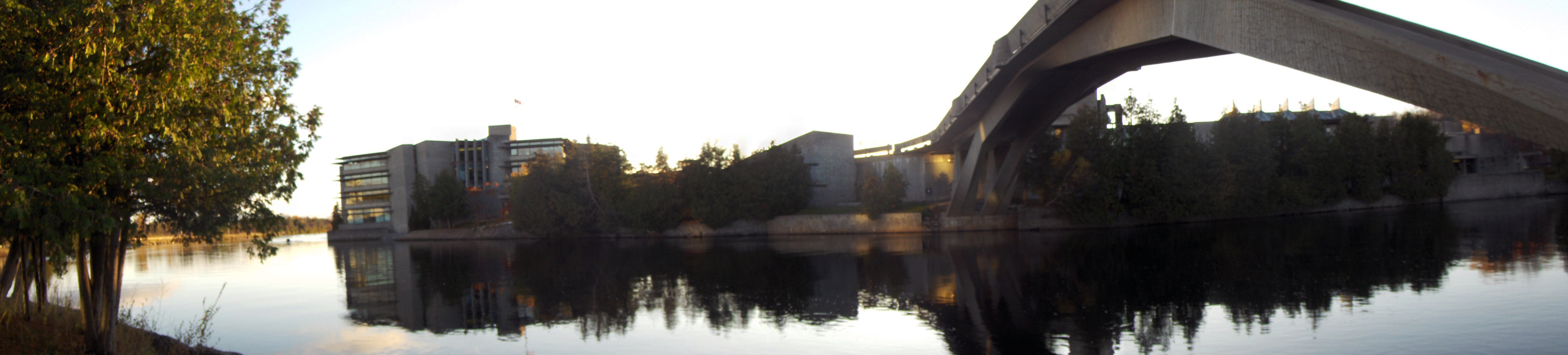
Trent University; a view across the Otonabee River, showing the west bank part of the campus, including Bata Library on the left. The Faryon bridge is to the right.

Otonabee College was founded in 1972. The college's name comes from that of the Otonabee River, which derives from the Anishinaabemowin word Odenabe meaning "river that beats like a heart". Eight "houses" connected by an interior walkway called "the Link" make up Otonabee's residence. The residence is co-educational, although there are single-sex areas within the houses. Past "the Link" (a path leading to the instructional area of the college that bisects the residences) are a set of faculty offices and the main dining hall, which looks to the north and east of the grounds. The academic wing is directly connected with the Science Buildings and houses the School of Education, as well as the departments of Psychology, Anthropology, Sociology, Forensic Sciences, Nursing, and Computing & Information Systems. Also located in Otonabee College is the Wenjack Theatre, which provides a venue for multimedia lecture presentations, as well as theatrical productions by amateur and professional companies.

==== Peter Gzowski College ====
Founded in 2003, Peter Gzowski College was named for CBC broadcaster Peter Gzowski, who was the university's eighth chancellor. At one point the college had two locations: on Argyle Street in buildings leased from the current Master's College and Seminary, which housed the Teacher Education and Nursing programs; and the Enwayaang building (Enwayaang means "the way we speak together" in Anishinaabe), which housed the Indigenous Studies, Economics, Mathematics, and Business Administration programs, as well as the First People's House of Learning. Departments at the Argyle location were moved to Enwayaang prior to the 2006–2007 academic year.

==== Gidigaa Migizi College ====
In November 2023, Trent announced that its sixth college would be named Gidigaa Migizi College, after the late Gidigaa Migizi (Doug Williams), a respected member of the Trent community and an Elder and community member of Curve Lake First Nation. Meaning spotted eagle in English, the name Gidigaa Migizi College was recommended by the university's Elders & Traditional Knowledge Keepers Council and approved by Trent's Board of Governors.

The college crest, designed by First Nations artist Jared Tait, features a spotted eagle, pike, and human profile in a woodland art style. The crest and college colours of dark blue, green, and turquoise were unveiled in February 2024 at the 48th annual Elders and Traditional Peoples Gathering. The building will include as many as 700 new residence beds, two large, flexible lecture halls that can be combined into one large space, and outdoor spaces including a rooftop balcony event space, a pavilion, and a quad. Gidigaa Migizi College will house faculty offices, classrooms, and student spaces, including a Student Services Hub. The building will be fully accessible and incorporate Indigenous design elements. It is aiming for LEED Gold certification and will incorporate geothermal heating and cooling systems.

The college is slated to open in fall 2028.

=== Trent University Durham GTA Campus ===
Trent's Durham GTA campus in Oshawa has been offering courses for over 50 years, initially in classrooms rented from the Eastwood Collegiate and Vocational Institute. Later, Trent took space at Durham College and steadily expanded the range of courses available before acquiring a former elementary school on Thornton Road. The building was renovated and expanded, and was officially inaugurated on 18 October 2010 for the 2010–2011 academic year. Over 3,000 full- and part-time students attend Trent University Durham in various undergraduate- and graduate-level programs, though not all programs from the main campus are offered at the satellite campus. In addition, there are several courses offered at Trent's Durham campus that students can take and later major in (and possibly minor in) at the Peterborough campus, including biology, computer information systems, cultural studies, economics, environmental & resource studies, geography, modern languages, philosophy, political studies, and women's studies.

=== Former colleges ===
==== Peter Robinson College ====
Peter Robinson College was the university's first college and was dedicated to Peter Robinson, the member of the Legislative Assembly of Upper Canada who oversaw the migration of Irish settlers to the local area in the 1820s and the namesake of the city of Peterborough. The college once had an apartment-style residence but it ceased operations when it was sold to a private landlord in 2004. The university administration closed down the college, against the protests of many students and faculty at the time.

=== Julian Blackburn College ===
Until 2011, Julian Blackburn College offered programs for part-time students in Peterborough. It was named after Julian Blackburn, one of the original professors who helped establish the university. The college is now defunct, but the Julian Blackburn Hall is now home to Trent's administration, as well as medical, counselling, printing, parking, registrar, financial aid, student affairs, student accounts, and several other university services.

== Graduate studies ==
At the graduate and doctorate levels, Trent has a number of programs, such as Anthropology M.A. (current focus is in physical anthropology and archaeology), Applications of Modelling in the Natural & Social Sciences M.A./M.Sc., Public Texts (English) M.A., History M.A., Cultural Studies M.A. and PhD, Environmental and Life Sciences (formerly known as Watershed Ecosystems) Ph.D. / M.Sc., and Materials Sciences Ph.D./M.Sc. as well as a Psychology M.A./M.Sc. The Frost Centre for Canadian Studies and Indigenous Studies offers an interdisciplinary Canadian Studies and Indigenous Studies M.A. program. In addition, the centre offers, in collaboration with Carleton University, a Canadian Studies Ph.D. program, which was the first of its kind in Canada.

In July 2014, Trent announced they would open a Masters in Educational Studies program in July 2015.

Full Time Equivalent Enrolment of Graduate Students at Trent University
2016-2017	2017-2018	2018-2019	2019-2020	2020-2021
400 Students	460 Students	540 Students	581 Students	663 Students

== Indigenous studies ==
For more than 50 years, Trent has incorporated traditional Indigenous teachings and perspectives into its programming. It was the first university in Canada, and the second in North America, to establish an academic department dedicated to the study of Indigenous peoples and Indigenous knowledge. Trent's Chanie Wenjack School for Indigenous Studies offers undergraduate, master's and Ph.D. programs in Indigenous Studies. Trent University offers a program in Indigenous Environmental Studies in addition to a specialized Diploma in Foundations of Indigenous Learning that provides access for people of Indigenous heritage. The First Peoples House of Learning houses Nozhem, a First Peoples performance space.

== Arctic research ==
The university is an active member of the University of the Arctic. UArctic is an international cooperative network based in the Circumpolar Arctic region, consisting of more than 200 universities, colleges, and other organizations with an interest in promoting education and research in the Arctic region.

== Administration ==
=== Chancellors ===
- Leslie Frost (1967–1973)
- Eugene Forsey (1973–1977)
- William Morton (1977–1980)
- Margaret Laurence (1981–1983)
- John J. Robinette (1984–1987)
- Kenneth Hare (1988–1995)
- Mary Simon (1995–1999)
- Peter Gzowski (1999–2002)
- Roberta Bondar (2003–2009)
- Tom Jackson (2009–2013)
- Don Tapscott (2013–2019)
- Stephen Stohn (2019–2026)
- Dr. Zabeen Hirji (2026–Present)

=== Presidents ===
- Thomas H. B. Symons (1963–1972)
- Thomas E. W. Nind (1972–1979)
- Donald F. Theall (1980–1987)
- John O. Stubbs (1987–1993)
- Leonard W. Conolly (1994–1997)
- David C. Smith, Interim (1997–1998)
- Bonnie M. Patterson (1998–2009)
- Steven E. Franklin (2009–2014)
- Leo Groarke (2014–2024)
- Cathy Bruce (2024–present)

=== Labour unions and associations ===
Part-time contract faculty (Course Instructors, Clinical Instructors, Tutorial Leaders, etc.) and Student Academic Workers (Graduate Teaching Assistants, Markers) are represented by the Canadian Union of Public Employees (CUPE) Local 3908. Support Staff (secretaries, maintenance staff, caretakers, groundskeepers, assistants, etc.) are part of the Ontario Public Service Employees Union (OPSEU) Local 365. Professors (Full, Associate, and Assistant) both full-time tenured and part-time are represented by the Trent University Faculty Association (TUFA). All full-time undergraduate and consecutive education students are represented through channels of the university by the Trent Central Student Association (TCSA) and the Trent Durham Student Association (TDSA), both of which operate as nonpartisan associations representing the best interest of all students. Full-time and part-time graduate students are represented by the Trent Graduate Students' Association (TGSA).

== Student life ==
=== Fraternities and Sororities ===
Trent University does not recognize fraternities and sororities. A few Greek clubs operate off-campus. Most notably is Tau Kappa Epsilon

=== Media ===
Arthur is a student and community newspaper associated with but editorially independent from Trent University. It was founded by Stephen Stohn in 1966. The paper has a print run of 1,500 copies per month from August to April during the academic year, and is distributed on the Trent campus and around the Peterborough community free of charge. The newspaper is supported by a non-refundable levy in the students' tuition fees. Absynthe Magazine is another student paper, which was founded in 1999 and is a submissions-based publication that is reliant on Trent's community members to provide content. Like Arthur, it is distributed free of charge but receives a refundable levy from each full-time student.

Trent Radio operates the community's student-sponsored community radio (formerly classified as student radio) broadcast facility called CFFF 92.7fm. Full-time students pay a membership fee as part of their student fees to support Trent Radio activities. The now defunct TrentBook was a website designed by students for students, which had articles and discussions on an array of topics that concerned Trent students. Students could also post and ask questions that they might want to have answered or discussed about.

The final scenes of Urban Legends: Final Cut (2000) were filmed at Trent University, as well as most of The Novice (2021).

=== Athletics ===
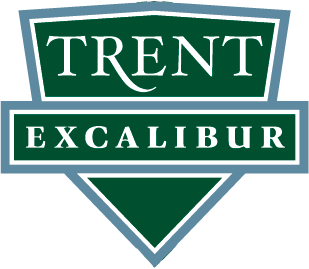
Trent Excalibur badge logo

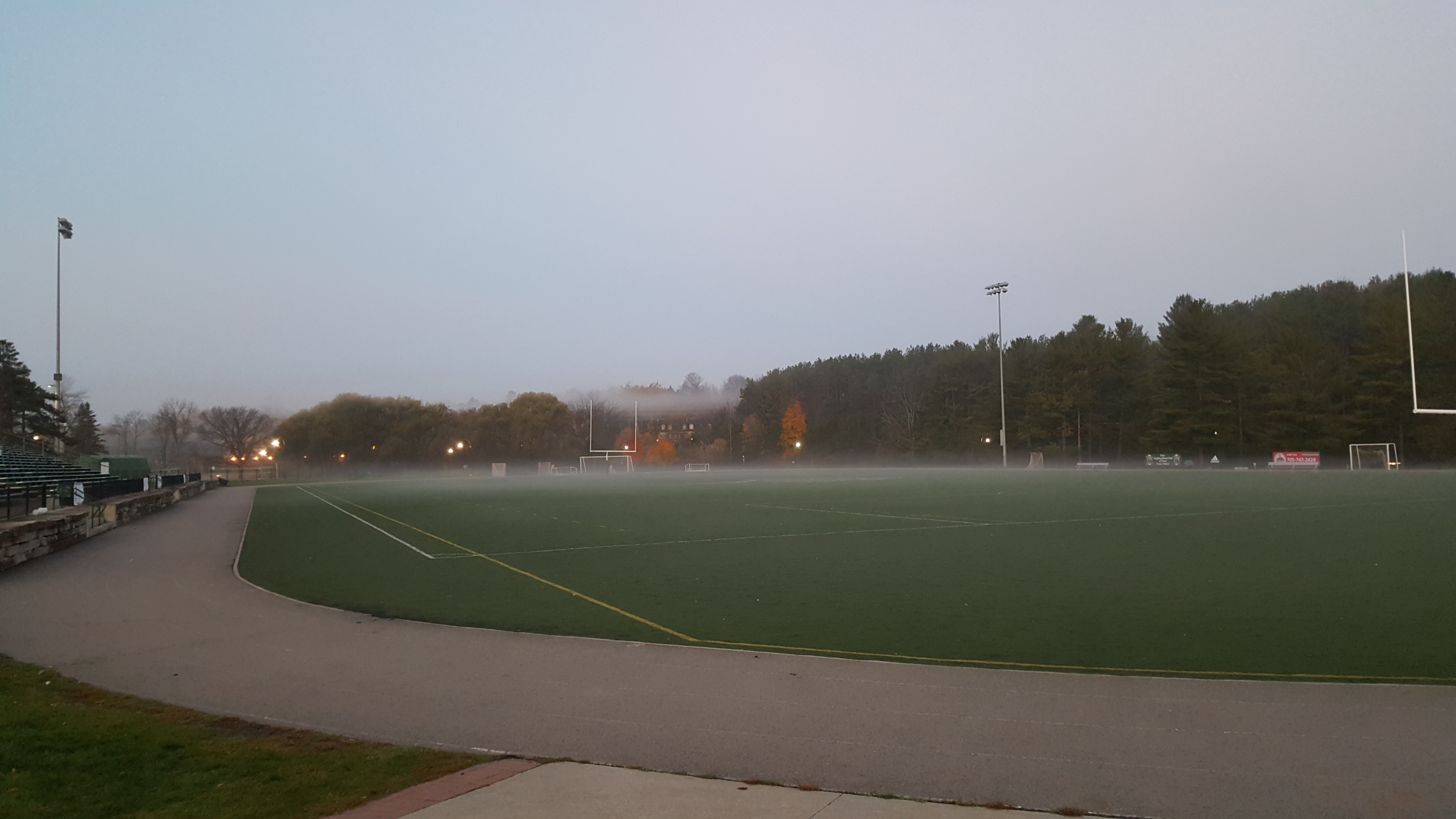
Justin Chiu Stadium covered by blankets of fog

There are many varsity and intramural sports at the university that compete at the varsity level under the name Excalibur, in men's and women's curling, cross country, rugby union, volleyball, fencing, rowing, competitive swimming, and soccer. Trent University installed a new artificial turf athletics field in the summer of 2005 that was built as part of Trent's bid to hold the 2007 U19 Women's Lacrosse Championships. There is seating for 1,000 spectators. Each autumn, Trent in conjunction with the Peterborough Rowing Club hosts the Head of the Trent rowing regatta, a 5-kilometre (3.1 mi) head-style race along the Trent Canal and Otonabee River that ends under the Faryon Bridge at the Symons campus. The day-long event is open to university, club, and high school crews.

In 2002–2003, the women's volleyball team obtained varsity status. Competing in the Ontario Colleges Athletics Association, Trent, over the last 10 years has grown into a top team in the east division. In 2009–2010, the Trent Women qualified for its first ever provincial championship held at Cambrian College. The 2010–2011 season saw Trent post a program best 18–2 regular season record, and another appearance at the provincial championships held at Loyalist College. After once again qualifying for the 2011–2012 provincial championships, Trent won the bid to host the 2012–2013 provincial championships, earning an automatic berth. Since then, the Trent women's volleyball team has had one athlete inducted into the OCAA Hall of Fame.

The Trent Excalibur women's lacrosse team have won 4 OUA championships in the program's history, firstly in 2016 then in 2019, 2022 and most recently 2025.

== Academic reputation ==
University rankings

World rankings
- USNWR World: 1570

Canadian rankings
- USNWR National: 35
- Maclean's Undergraduate: 4
- Maclean's Reputation: 30

In Maclean's 2025 university rankings, Trent University ranked sixth in its "primarily undergraduate" category.

Trent University is ranked 29th among Canada's top universities and 884th among the world's universities, according to the Center for World University Rankings (CWUR) 2016 list of the world's top 1,000 universities, up from number 31 nationally, and number 910 overall worldwide in 2015. This places Trent University in the top 3.6% of universities worldwide. Trent University was one of 32 universities to make the list in Canada.

== See also ==
- List of Ontario Universities
- Ontario Student Assistance Program
- Higher education in Ontario
- Canadian Interuniversity Sport
- Canadian government scientific research organizations
- Canadian university scientific research organizations
- Canadian industrial research and development organizations
