= Sum of Logic =

1323 textbook on logic by William of Ockham

The Summa Logicae ("Sum of Logic") is a textbook on logic by William of Ockham. It was written around 1323.

Systematically, it resembles other works of medieval logic, organised under the basic headings of the Aristotelian Predicables, Categories, terms, propositions, and syllogisms. These headings, though often given in a different order, represent the basic arrangement of scholastic works on logic.

This work is important in that it contains the main account of Ockham's nominalism, a position related to the problem of universals.

== Book I. On Terms ==
1. Chapters 1–17 deal with terms: what they are, and how they are divide into categorematic, abstract and concrete, absolute and connotative, first intention, and second intention. Ockham also introduces the issue of universals here.
2. Chapters 18–25 deal with the five predicables of Porphyry.
3. Chapters 26–62 deal with the Categories of Aristotle, known to the medieval philosophers as the Praedicamenta in the Latin translation of Boethius. The first chapters of this section concern definition and description, the notions of subject and predicate, the meaning of terms like whole, being and so on. The later chapters deal with the ten Categories themselves, as follows: Substance (42–43), Quantity (44–49), Relation (50–54), Quality (55–56), Action (57), Passion (58), Time (59), Place (60), Position (61), Habit (62).
4. Chapters 63–77 onwards deal with the theory of supposition.

== Book II. On Propositions ==
1. On categorical propositions (1–20)
2. On the conversion of propositions (21–9)
3. On hypothetical propositions (30–7)

== Book III. On Syllogisms ==
=== Part I. On Syllogisms ===
1. On categorical syllogisms (1–19)
2. On modal syllogisms (20–30)
3. On mixed syllogisms (31–64)
4. On syllogisms containing exponible propositions

=== Part II. On Demonstration ===
- These 41 chapters are a systematic exposition of Aristotle's Posterior Analytics.

=== Part III. On Consequences ===
- The first 37 chapters of Part II are a systematic exposition of Aristotle's Topics. In Part III, Ockham deals with the definition and division of consequences, and provides a treatment of Aristotle's Topical rules. According to Ockham a consequence is a conditional proposition, composed of two categorical propositions by the terms 'if' and 'then'. For example, 'if a man runs, then God exists' (Si homo currit, Deus est). A consequence is 'true' when the antecedent implies the consequent. Ockham distinguishes between 'material' and 'formal' consequences, which are roughly equivalent to the modern material implication and logical implication respectively. Similar accounts are given by Jean Buridan and Albert of Saxony.
- Chapters 38 to 45 deal with the Theory of obligationes.
- Chapter 46 deals with the Liar Paradox

=== Part IV. On Fallacies (in 18 chapters) ===
Part IV, in eighteen chapters, deals with the different species of fallacy enumerated by Aristotle in Sophistical Refutations (De sophisticis elenchis).

- Chapters 2-4 deal with the three modes of equivocation.
- Chapters 5-7 deal with the three types of amphiboly.
- Chapter 8 deals with the fallacies of composition, and division.
- Chapter 9 deals with the fallacy of accent.
- Chapter 10 deals with the fallacy of 'figure of speech'.
- Chapter 11 deals with the fallacy of accident.
- Chapter 12 deals with the fallacy of affirming the consequent.
- Chapter 13 deals with secundum quid et simpliciter.
- Chapter 14 deals with Ignoratio elenchi or irrelevant thesis.
- Chapter 15 deals with begging the question (petitio principii).
- Chapter 16 deals with false cause (non-causam ut causam)
- Chapter 17 deals with the fallacy of many questions (plures interrogationes ut unam facere)>
- Ockham ends (chapter 18) by showing how all these fallacies err against the syllogism.

== See also ==
- Adam de Wodeham (wrote foreword to Sum of Logic)
- Summa Theologica by Thomas Aquinas
