= Reification (fallacy) =

Fallacy of treating an abstraction as if it were a real thing

Reification (also known as concretism, hypostatization, or the fallacy of misplaced concreteness) is a fallacy of ambiguity, when an abstraction (abstract belief or hypothetical construct) is treated as if it were a concrete real event or physical entity. In other words, it is the error of treating something that is not concrete, such as an idea, as a concrete thing. A common case of reification is the confusion of a model with reality: "the map is not the territory".

Reification is part of normal usage of natural language, as well as of literature, where a reified abstraction is intended as a figure of speech, and actually understood as such. But the use of reification in logical reasoning or rhetoric is misleading and usually regarded as a fallacy.

A potential consequence of reification is exemplified by Goodhart's law, where changes in the measurement of a phenomenon are mistaken for changes to the phenomenon itself.

== Etymology ==
The term reification originates from a Latinate combination of the word for "thing", res (combinative form: re, as in republic, "the public thing"), with the suffixes -ificare ("-ify", lit. 'to make', related to facio) and -tio (oblique stem: -tion-, denoting an action or process, similar to -ing), thus meaning "the action of making (into) a thing", or more pithily "thingmaking", being the transformation of the abstract into the concrete.

== Theory ==
Reification takes place when natural or social processes are misunderstood or simplified; for example, when human creations are described as "facts of nature, results of cosmic laws, or manifestations of divine will".

Reification may derive from an innate tendency to simplify experience by assuming constancy as much as possible.

== Fallacy of misplaced concreteness ==
According to Alfred North Whitehead, one commits the fallacy of misplaced concreteness when one mistakes an abstract belief, opinion, or concept about the way things are for a physical or "concrete" reality: "There is an error; but it is merely the accidental error of mistaking the abstract for the concrete. It is an example of what might be called the 'Fallacy of Misplaced Concreteness.'" Whitehead proposed the fallacy in a discussion of the relation of spatial and temporal location of objects. He rejects the notion that a concrete physical object in the universe can be ascribed a simple spatial or temporal extension, that is, without reference to its relations to other spatial or temporal extensions.

[...] apart from any essential reference of the relations of [a] bit of matter to other regions of space [...] there is no element whatever which possesses this character of simple location. [... Instead,] I hold that by a process of constructive abstraction we can arrive at abstractions which are the simply located bits of material, and at other abstractions which are the minds included in the scientific scheme. Accordingly, the real error is an example of what I have termed: The Fallacy of Misplaced Concreteness.

== Vicious abstractionism ==
In 1909, William James used the notion of "vicious abstractionism" and "vicious intellectualism" in various places, especially to criticize Immanuel Kant's and Georg Wilhelm Friedrich Hegel's idealistic philosophies. In The Meaning of Truth, James wrote:

Let me give the name of "vicious abstractionism" to a way of using concepts which may be thus described: We conceive a concrete situation by singling out some salient or important feature in it, and classing it under that; then, instead of adding to its previous characters all the positive consequences which the new way of conceiving it may bring, we proceed to use our concept privatively; reducing the originally rich phenomenon to the naked suggestions of that name abstractly taken, treating it as a case of "nothing but" that concept, and acting as if all the other characters from out of which the concept is abstracted were expunged. Abstraction, functioning in this way, becomes a means of arrest far more than a means of advance in thought. ... The viciously privative employment of abstract characters and class names is, I am persuaded, one of the great original sins of the rationalistic mind.

In a chapter on "The Methods and Snares of Psychology" in The Principles of Psychology, James describes a related fallacy, the psychologist's fallacy, thus: "The great snare of the psychologist is the confusion of his own standpoint with that of the mental fact about which he is making his report. I shall hereafter call this the 'psychologist's fallacy' par excellence" (volume 1, p. 196). John Dewey followed James in describing a variety of fallacies, including "the philosophic fallacy", "the analytic fallacy", and "the fallacy of definition".

== Use of constructs in science ==
The concept of a "construct" has a long history in science; it is used in many, if not most, areas of science. A construct is a hypothetical explanatory variable that is not directly observable. For example, the concepts of motivation in psychology, utility in economics, and gravitational field in physics are constructs; they are not directly observable, but instead are tools to describe natural phenomena.

The degree to which a construct is useful and accepted as part of the current paradigm in a scientific community depends on empirical research that has demonstrated that a scientific construct has construct validity (especially, predictive validity).

Stephen Jay Gould draws heavily on the idea of fallacy of reification in his book The Mismeasure of Man. He argues that the error in using intelligence quotient scores to judge people's intelligence is that, just because a quantity called "intelligence" or "intelligence quotient" is defined as a measurable thing does not mean that intelligence is real; thus denying the validity of the construct "intelligence."

== Relation to other fallacies ==
Pathetic fallacy (also known as anthropomorphic fallacy or anthropomorphization) is a specific type of reification. Just as reification is the attribution of concrete characteristics to an abstract idea, a pathetic fallacy is committed when those characteristics are specifically human characteristics, especially thoughts or feelings. Pathetic fallacy is also related to personification, which is a direct and explicit ascription of life and sentience to the thing in question, whereas the pathetic fallacy is much broader and more allusive.

The animistic fallacy involves attributing personal intention to an event or situation.

Reification fallacy should not be confused with other fallacies of ambiguity:

- Accentus, where the ambiguity arises from the emphasis (accent) placed on a word or phrase
- Amphiboly, a verbal fallacy arising from ambiguity in the grammatical structure of a sentence
- Composition, when one assumes that a whole has a property solely because its various parts have that property
- Division, when one assumes that various parts have a property solely because the whole has that same property
- Equivocation, the misleading use of a word with more than one meaning

== As a rhetorical device ==
The rhetorical devices of metaphor and personification express a form of reification, but short of a fallacy. These devices, by definition, do not apply literally and thus exclude any fallacious conclusion that the formal reification is real. For example, the metaphor known as the pathetic fallacy, "the sea was angry" reifies anger, but does not imply that anger is a concrete substance, or that water is sentient. The distinction is that a fallacy inhabits faulty reasoning, and not the mere illustration or poetry of rhetoric.

== Counterexamples ==
Reification, while usually fallacious, is sometimes considered a valid argument. Thomas Schelling, a game theorist during the Cold War, argued that for many purposes an abstraction shared between disparate people caused itself to become real. Examples are: the effect of round numbers in stock prices, the importance placed on the Dow Jones Industrial index, national borders and preferred numbers. (Compare the theory of social constructionism.)

== See also ==
- All models are wrong – Aphorism in statistics
- Counterfactual definiteness – Concept in quantum mechanics
- Conceptual proliferation – Unabounded conceptualization obscuring the true nature of reality
- Hypostatic abstraction – Formal operation in mathematical logic
- Idolatry – Worship of an idol as though it were a god
- Objectification – Treating persons as objects
- Pathetic fallacy – Attribution of human emotion and conduct to non-human things
- Personification – Representation of a thing or abstraction as a person
- Philosophical realism – Philosophical concept
- Problem of universals – Philosophical question
- Reification (Marxism) – Treatment of social attributes as real, in Marxist theory
- Surrogation – Psychological phenomenon; replacement of a construct with its measurement
