= Fallacy =

Argument that uses faulty reasoning

A fallacy is the use of invalid or otherwise faulty reasoning in the construction of an argument that may appear to be well-reasoned if unnoticed. The term was introduced in the Western intellectual tradition by the Aristotelian De Sophisticis Elenchis.

Fallacies in reasoning may be invoked intentionally to manipulate or persuade by deception, unintentionally because of human limitations such as carelessness, cognitive or social biases and ignorance, or potentially due to the limitations of language and understanding of language. These delineations include not only the ignorance of the right reasoning standard but also the ignorance of relevant properties of the context. For instance, the soundness of legal arguments depends on the context in which they are made.

A fallacy does not necessarily lead to a false conclusion: it may accidentally be a result of invalid reasoning. An example is the fallacy of affirming the consequent.

Fallacies are commonly divided into "formal" and "informal". A formal fallacy is a flaw in the structure of a deductive argument that renders the argument invalid, while an informal fallacy originates in an error in reasoning other than an improper logical form. Arguments containing informal fallacies may be formally valid, but still fallacious.

A special case is a mathematical fallacy, an intentionally invalid mathematical proof with a concealed, or subtle, error. Mathematical fallacies are typically crafted and exhibited for educational purposes, usually taking the form of false proofs of obvious contradictions.

== Overview ==
Fallacies are types of erroneous reasoning that render arguments logically unsound. According to The New Handbook of Cognitive Therapy Techniques, they include "unsubstantiated assertions that are often delivered with a conviction that makes them sound as though they are proven facts". Informal fallacies, in particular, are frequently found in mass media such as television and newspapers. Understanding fallacies may allow one to recognize them in either one's own or others' writing. Avoiding fallacies may help improve one's ability to produce sound arguments.

It can be difficult to evaluate whether an argument is fallacious, as arguments exist along a continuum of soundness and an argument that has several stages or parts might have some sound sections and some fallacious ones. Moreover, whether a specific argument is fallacious often depends on the content rather than the form of the argument. An example is a probabilistically valid instance of the formally invalid argument form of denying the antecedent or affirming the consequent. Thus, "fallacious arguments usually have the deceptive appearance of being good arguments, because for most fallacious instances of an argument form, a similar but non-fallacious instance can be found". Evaluating an instance of an argument as fallacious is therefore often a matter of evaluating the context of the argument.

Recognizing fallacies in everyday arguments may be difficult since arguments are often embedded in rhetorical patterns that obscure the logical connections between statements. Informal fallacies may also exploit the emotional, intellectual, or psychological weaknesses of the audience. Recognizing fallacies can develop reasoning skills to expose the weaker links between premises and conclusions to better discern between what appears to be true and what is true.

Argumentation theory provides a different approach to understanding and classifying fallacies. In the pragma-dialectical theory, for instance, an argument is regarded as an interactive protocol between individuals who attempt to resolve their disagreement on the merits of a case. The protocol consists of normative rules of interaction, and violations of these rules are considered fallacies because they frustrate the attempt at resolving the disagreement.

Fallacies are used in place of valid reasoning to communicate a point with the intention to persuade. Examples in the mass media today include but are not limited to propaganda, advertisements, politics, newspaper editorials, and opinion-based news shows.

== Systems of classification ==
Fallacies are generally classified strictly by either their structure or their content, such as by classifying them as formal fallacies or informal fallacies, respectively. The classification of informal fallacies may be subdivided into categories such as linguistic, relevance through omission, relevance through intrusion, and relevance through presumption. Alternatively, fallacies may be classified by the process by which they occur, such as material fallacies (content), verbal fallacies (linguistic), and formal fallacies (error in inference). In turn, material fallacies may be placed into the more general category of informal fallacies. Verbal fallacies may be placed in either formal or informal classifications: Compare equivocation, which is a word- or phrase-based ambiguity, to the fallacy of composition, which is premise- and inference-based ambiguity.

=== Greek logic ===
The Greek philosopher Aristotle (384–322 BC) was the first to systematize logical errors into a list to make it easier to refute an opponent's thesis and thus win an argument. Aristotle's Sophistical Refutations (De Sophisticis Elenchis) identifies thirteen fallacies. He divided them up into two major types: linguistic fallacies and non-linguistic fallacies, some of which depend on language and others that do not. These fallacies are called verbal fallacies and material fallacies, respectively. A material fallacy is an error in what the arguer is talking about, while a verbal fallacy is an error in how the arguer is talking. Verbal fallacies are those in which a conclusion is obtained by improper or ambiguous use of words. An example of a language dependent fallacy is given as a debate as to who in humanity are learners: the wise or the ignorant. A language-independent fallacy is, for example:

1. "Coriscus is different from Socrates."
2. "Socrates is a man."
3. "Therefore, Coriscus is different from a man."

=== Indian logic ===
Indian logicians studied fallacies in arguments. An influential collection of texts on logic and reason, the Nyāya Sūtras, attributed to Aksapada Gautama, variously estimated to have been composed between the 6th century BCE and the 2nd century CE, lists in its theory of inference five such reasons used in an argument that was further developed by later logicians.

1. Asiddha: It is the unproved reason that results in this fallacy. [Paksadharmata]
2. Savyabhichara: This is the fallacy of irregular reason.
3. Satpratipaksa: Here the reason is contradicted by another reason. If both have equal force, then nothing follows. 'Sound is eternal, because it is audible', and 'Sound is non-eternal, because it is produced'. Here 'audible' is counterbalanced by 'produced' and both are of equal force.
4. Badhita: When another proof (as by perception) definitely contradicts and disproves the middle term (reason). 'Fire is cold because it is a substance'.
5. Viruddha: Instead of proving something it is proving the opposite. 'Sound is eternal because it is produced'.

=== Whately's grouping ===
English scholar and theologian Richard Whately (1787–1863) defines a fallacy broadly as, "any argument, or apparent argument, which professes to be decisive of the matter at hand, while in reality it is not".

Whately divided fallacies into two groups: logical and material. According to Whately, logical fallacies are arguments where the conclusion does not follow from the premises. Material fallacies are not logical errors because the conclusion follows from the premises. He then divided the logical group into two groups: purely logical and semi-logical. The semi-logical group included all of Aristotle's sophisms except ignoratio elenchi, petitio principii, and non causa pro causa, which are in the material group.

=== Other systems of classification ===
Other famous methods of classifying fallacies are those of Francis Bacon and J. S. Mill. Bacon (Novum Organum, Aph. 33, 38 sqq.) divided fallacies into four Idola (Idols, i.e. False Appearances), which summarize the various kinds of mistakes to which the human intellect is prone. J. S. Mill discussed the subject in book five of his Logic, and Jeremy Bentham's Book of Fallacies (1824) contains valuable remarks.

== Formal fallacy ==
A formal fallacy, deductive fallacy, logical fallacy or non sequitur (Latin for "it does not follow") is a flaw in the structure of a deductive argument that renders the argument invalid. The flaw can be expressed in the standard system of logic. Such an argument is always considered to be wrong. The presence of the formal fallacy does not imply anything about the argument's premises or its conclusion. Both may actually be true or may even be more probable as a result of the argument, but the deductive argument is still invalid because the conclusion does not follow from the premises in the manner described.

Even non-deductive arguments can be said to be fallacious: for example, an inductive argument that incorrectly applies principles of probability or causality. But "since deductive arguments depend on formal properties and inductive arguments don't, formal fallacies apply only to deductive arguments".

A logical form such as "A and B" is independent of any particular conjunction of meaningful propositions. Logical form alone can guarantee that, given true premises, a true conclusion must follow. However, formal logic makes no such guarantee if any premise is false; the conclusion can be either true or false. Any formal error or logical fallacy similarly invalidates the deductive guarantee. Both the argument and all its premises must be true for a conclusion to be true.

The term non sequitur denotes a general formal fallacy, often meaning one that does not belong to any named subclass of formal fallacies, like affirming the consequent.

=== Fallacy fork ===
Maarten Boudry and others have argued that formal, deductive fallacies rarely occur in real life and that arguments that would be fallacious in formally deductive terms are not necessarily so when context and prior probabilities are taken into account, thus making the argument defeasible and/or inductive. Boudry coined the term fallacy fork. For a given fallacy, one must either characterize it by means of a deductive argumentation scheme, which rarely applies (the first prong of the fork), or one must relax definitions and add nuance to take the actual intent and context of the argument into account (the other prong of the fork). To argue, for example, that one became nauseated after eating a mushroom because the mushroom was poisonous could be an example of the post hoc ergo propter hoc fallacy.

== Informal fallacy ==
In contrast to a formal fallacy, an informal fallacy originates from a reasoning error other than a flaw in the logical form of the argument. A deductive argument containing an informal fallacy may be formally valid, but still remain rationally unpersuasive. Nevertheless, informal fallacies apply to both deductive and non-deductive arguments.

Though the form of the argument may be relevant, fallacies of this type are "types of mistakes in reasoning that arise from the mishandling of the content of the propositions constituting the argument".

=== Faulty generalization ===
A special subclass of the informal fallacies is the set of faulty generalizations, also known as inductive fallacies. Here, the most important issue concerns inductive strength or methodology (for example, statistical inference). In the absence of sufficient evidence, drawing conclusions based on induction is unwarranted and fallacious. With the backing of sufficient amounts of the right type of empirical evidence, however, the conclusions may become warranted and convincing (at which point the arguments are no longer considered fallacious).

==== Hasty generalization ====
Hasty generalization is described as making assumptions about a whole group or range of cases based on a sample that is inadequate (usually because it is atypical or just too small). Stereotypes about people ("frat boys are drunkards", "grad students are nerdy", "women don't enjoy sports", etc.) are common examples of the principle.

Hasty generalization often follows a pattern such as:

1. X is true for A.
2. X is true for B.
3. Therefore, X is true for C, D, etc.

While never a valid logical deduction, if such an inference can be made on statistical grounds, it may nonetheless be convincing. This is because with enough empirical evidence, the generalization is no longer a hasty one.

=== Relevance fallacy ===
The fallacies of relevance are a broad class of informal fallacies, generically represented by missing the point: presenting an argument that may be sound but fails to address the issue in question. This includes taking in account irrelevant consideration or failing to take relevant consideration.

==== Argument from silence ====
An argument from silence is a faulty conclusion that is drawn based on the absence of evidence rather than on the presence of evidence.

=== Examples of informal fallacies ===
==== Post hoc (false cause) ====
The post hoc fallacy assumes that because B comes after A, A caused B. It gets its name from the Latin phrase "post hoc, ergo propter hoc", which translates as "after this, therefore because of this".

Sometimes one event really does cause another one that comes later—for example, if one registers for a class and their name later appears on the roll, it's true that the first event caused the one that came later. But sometimes two events that seem related in time are not really related as cause and event. That is, temporal correlation does not necessarily entail causation. For example, if one eats a sandwich and then gets food poisoning, that does not necessarily mean the sandwich caused the food poisoning. Something else eaten earlier might have caused the food poisoning.

==== Slippery slope ====
For an argument to be a slippery slope type of argument, it must meet the requirements of that argumentation scheme. A slippery slope argument originates from a conversation or debate in which two actors take turns. It usually originates from one actor giving advice on a decision or act. Along the way, the actor must make additional choices on similar matters through which the actor enters the ‘grey area’ of the slippery slope. At this point, the actor potentially loses control over the direction of the arguments, thus leading to a ‘fatal’ outcome.

Such an argument is built up according to the following argumentation scheme: initial premise, sequential premise, indeterminacy premise, control premise, loss of control premise, catastrophic outcome premise, and conclusion. Slippery slope arguments may be defeated by asking critical questions or giving counterarguments.

There are several reasons for a slippery slope to be fallacious: for example, the argument is going too far into the future, the argument is too complex and its structure is hard to identify, or the argument makes emotional appeals.

It may be that a slippery slope is not necessarily fallacious if context is taken into account and there is an effort to assess plausibility.

==== False analogy ====
Informally known as the "apples and oranges" fallacy, a false analogy uses unsound comparisons.

==== Straw man fallacy ====
The straw man fallacy refers to the refutation of a standpoint in an argument that was never proposed. The fallacy usually occurs in the presentation of an opponent's standpoint as more extreme, distorted, or simplistic than it actually is. Compared to criticizing the opponent's actual standpoint, this allows the arguer to offer a seeming refutation of what is, however, not the actual standpoint. Such an argument involves two arguers, with one criticizing the other's perspective. The reason for the straw man argument to be fallacious originates from the problem of how to deal with natural discourse. The opponent's argument is not reflected by the arguments that are proposed by the speaker.

== Measurement fallacy ==
Some of the fallacies described above may be committed in the context of measurement. Where mathematical fallacies are subtle mistakes in reasoning leading to invalid mathematical proofs, measurement fallacies are unwarranted inferential leaps involved in the extrapolation of raw data to a measurement-based value claim. The ancient Greek Sophist Protagoras was one of the first thinkers to propose that humans can generate reliable measurements through his "human-measure" principle and the practice of dissoi logoi (arguing multiple sides of an issue). This history helps explain why measurement fallacies are informed by informal logic and argumentation theory.

=== Knowledge value measurement fallacy ===
The increasing availability and circulation of big data are driving a proliferation of new metrics for scholarly authority, and there is lively discussion regarding the relative usefulness of such metrics for measuring the value of knowledge production in the context of an "information tsunami".

For example, anchoring fallacies can occur when unwarranted weight is given to data generated by metrics that the arguers themselves acknowledge are flawed. For example, the limitations of the journal impact factor (JIF) are well documented, and even JIF pioneer Eugene Garfield notes that, "while citation data create new tools for analyses of research performance, it should be stressed that they supplement rather than replace other quantitative and qualitative indicators". To the extent that arguers jettison the acknowledged limitations of JIF-generated data in evaluative judgments or leave behind Garfield's "supplement rather than replace" caveat, they commit anchoring fallacies.

The observational interpretation fallacy is the cognitive bias where association identified in observational studies are misinterpreted as causal relationships.

A naturalistic fallacy can occur, for example, in the case of sheer quantity metrics based on the premise "more is better" or, in the case of developmental assessment in the field of psychology, "higher is better".

A false analogy occurs when claims are supported by unsound comparisons between data points. For example, the Scopus and Web of Science bibliographic databases have difficulty distinguishing between citations of scholarly work that are arms-length endorsements, ceremonial citations, or negative citations (indicating the citing author withholds endorsement of the cited work). Hence, measurement-based value claims premised on the uniform quality of all citations may be questioned on false analogy grounds.

As another example, consider the Faculty Scholarly Productivity Index of Academic Analytics. This tool purports to measure overall faculty productivity, yet it does not capture data based on citations in books. This creates a possibility that low productivity measurements using the tool commit argument from silence fallacies, to the extent that such measurements are supported by the absence of book citation data.

Ecological fallacies can be committed when one measures the scholarly productivity of a sub-group of individuals (e.g. "Puerto Rican" faculty) via reference to aggregate data about a larger and different group (e.g., "Hispanic" faculty).

== Intentional fallacy ==
Sometimes a speaker or writer uses a fallacy intentionally. In any context, including academic debate, a conversation among friends, political discourse, advertising, or comedic purposes, the arguer may use fallacious reasoning to try to persuade the listener or reader, by means other than offering relevant evidence, that the conclusion is true.

Examples of this include the speaker or writer:

1. Diverting the argument to unrelated issues with a red herring (Ignoratio elenchi)
2. Insulting someone's character (argumentum ad hominem)
3. Assuming the conclusion of an argument, a kind of circular reasoning, also called "begging the question" (petitio principii)
4. Making jumps in logic (non sequitur)
5. Identifying a false cause and effect (post hoc ergo propter hoc)
6. Asserting that everyone agrees (argumentum ad populum, bandwagoning)
7. Creating a false dilemma (either-or fallacy) in which the situation is oversimplified, also called false dichotomy
8. Selectively using facts (card stacking)
9. Making false or misleading comparisons (false equivalence or false analogy)
10. Generalizing quickly and sloppily (hasty generalization) (secundum quid)
11. Using an argument's connections to other concepts or people to support or refute it, also called "guilt by association" (association fallacy)
12. Claiming that a lack of proof counts as proof (appeal to ignorance)

In humor, errors of reasoning are used for comical purposes. Groucho Marx used fallacies of amphiboly, for instance, to make ironic statements; Gary Larson and Scott Adams employed fallacious reasoning in many of their cartoons. Wes Boyer and Samuel Stoddard have written a humorous essay teaching students how to be persuasive by means of a whole host of informal and formal fallacies.

When someone uses logical fallacies intentionally to mislead in academic, political, or other high-stakes contexts, the breach of trust calls into question the authority and intellectual integrity of that person.

== Assessment: pragmatic theory ==
According to the pragmatic theory of logical fallacies, a fallacy can be either a heuristic error or a ploy used intentionally to unfairly win an argument. There are always two parties to an argument containing a fallacy: the perpetrator and the intended victim.

The dialogue framework required to support the pragmatic theory of fallacy is built on the presumption that argumentative dialogue has both an adversarial component and a collaborative component. A dialogue has individual goals for each participant as well as shared goals that apply to all participants. A fallacy of the second kind is seen as more than simply a violation of the rule of reasonable dialogue. It is also a deceptive tactic of argumentation based on sleight-of-hand. Aristotle explicitly compared contentious reasoning to unfair fighting in athletic contests. But the roots of the pragmatic theory go back even further in history, to the Sophists. The pragmatic theory finds its roots in the Aristotelian conception of a fallacy as a sophistical refutation but also supports the view that many of the types of arguments traditionally labeled as fallacies are in fact reasonable techniques of argumentation that can be used, in many cases, to support legitimate goals of dialogue. Hence, under the pragmatic approach, each case needs to be analyzed individually to determine whether the argument is fallacious or reasonable.

== See also ==
Lists

- List of cognitive biases
- List of fallacies
- List of paradoxes – List of statements that appear to contradict themselves

Concepts

- Argument map – Visual representation of the structure of an argument
- Argumentation theory – Academic field of logic and rhetoric
- Cognitive bias – Systematic pattern of deviation from norm or rationality in judgment
- Cognitive bias mitigation – Reduction of the negative effects of cognitive biases
- Critical thinking – Analysis of facts to form a judgment
- False statement – Statement contradicted by facts and reality
- Inference objection – Reason arguing against a premise, argument, or conclusion; expression of disagreement
- Inquiry – Type of investigation
- Jumping to conclusions – Psychological term
- Lies, damned lies, and statistics – Phrase criticising misuse of statistics
- Paradox – Logically self-contradictory statement
- Rationalism – Epistemological view centered on reason
- Sophist – Teachers of 5th century BC Greece
- Soundness – Term in logic and deductive reasoning
- Thought-terminating cliché – Commonly used phrase used to quell cognitive dissonance
- Truth – Conformity to reality
- Validity – Argument whose conclusion must be true if its premises are
