= Sophistical Refutations =

Text by Aristotle on logical fallacies

Sophistical Refutations (Greek: Σοφιστικοὶ Ἔλεγχοι, romanized: Sophistikoi Elenchoi; Latin: De Sophisticis Elenchis) is a text in Aristotle's Organon in which he identified twelve or thirteen fallacies. According to Aristotle, this is the first work to treat the subject of deductive reasoning in ancient Greece (Soph. Ref., 34, 183b34 ff.). In it, he attempts to develop a pattern of sound and genuine reasoning in opposition to the deceptive or misleading "art of sophistry".

== Overview ==
On Sophistical Refutations consists of 34 chapters. The book naturally falls in two parts: chapters concerned with tactics for the Questioner (3–8 and 12–15) and chapters concerned with tactics for the Answerer (16–32). Besides, there is an introduction (1–2), an interlude (9–11), and a conclusion (33–34).

== Fallacies identified ==
The fallacies Aristotle identifies in Chapter 4 (formal fallacies) and 5 (informal fallacies) of this book are the following:

Fallacies in the language or formal fallacies (in dictionem):

1. Equivocation
2. Amphiboly
3. Composition
4. Division
5. Accent
6. Figure of speech or form of expression

Fallacies not in the language or informal fallacies (extra dictionem):

7. Accident
8. Secundum quid
9. Irrelevant conclusion
10. Petitio principii
11. False cause
12. Affirming the consequent
13. Fallacy of many questions
