= Destroying the exception =

Destroying the exception may refer to:

- Accident (fallacy), fallacy when an exception to a rule of thumb is ignored
- Converse accident, fallacy when a rule that applies only to an exceptional case is wrongly applied to all cases in general
