= Argument from analogy =

Logical reasoning method

Argument from analogy is a special type of inductive argument, where perceived similarities are used as a basis to infer some further similarity that has not been observed yet. Analogical reasoning is one of the most common methods by which human beings try to understand the world and make decisions. When a person has a bad experience with a product and decides not to buy anything further from the producer, this is often a case of analogical reasoning since the two products share a maker and are therefore both perceived as being bad. It is also the basis of much of science; for instance, experiments on laboratory rats are based on the fact that some physiological similarities between rats and humans implies some further similarity (e.g., possible reactions to a drug).

== Structure ==
The process of analogical inference involves noting the shared properties of two or more things, and from this basis concluding that they also share some further property. The structure or form may be generalised like so:

1. P and Q are similar in respect to properties a, b, and c.
2. P has been observed to have further property x.
3. Therefore, Q probably has property x also.

The argument does not assert that the two things are identical, only that they are similar. The argument may provide us with good evidence for the conclusion, but the conclusion does not follow as a matter of logical necessity. Determining the strength of the argument requires that we take into consideration more than just the form: the content must also come under scrutiny.

== Analysing arguments from analogy ==
=== Strength of an analogy ===
Several factors affect the strength of the argument from analogy, including

- the relevance (positive or negative) of the known similarities to the similarity inferred in the conclusion,
- the degree of relevant similarity (or difference) between the two objects,
- and the amount and variety of instances that form the basis of the analogy.

=== Counterarguments ===
Arguments from analogy may be attacked by using disanalogy, using counteranalogy, and by pointing out unintended consequences of an analogy. To understand how one might analyse an argument from analogy, consider the teleological argument and its criticisms put forward by the philosopher David Hume.

The logic behind the watchmaker argument states that you cannot assume that a complex and precise object like a watch was created through some random process. We can easily infer that such objects had an intelligent creator who planned its use. Therefore, we ought to draw the same conclusion for another complex and apparently designed object: the universe.

Hume argued that the universe and a watch have many relevant differences. For instance, the universe is often very disorderly and random but a watch is not. This form of argument is called "disanalogy". If the amount and variety of relevant similarities between two objects strengthens an analogical conclusion, then the amount and variety of relevant differences have to weaken it. Creating a "counteranalogy," Hume argued that some natural objects seem to have order and complexity — snowflakes for example — but are not the result of intelligent direction. But even if the snowflake's order and complexity might not have direction, their causes might. So this falsifies the statement but begs the question. Finally, Hume provides many possible "unintended consequences" of the argument. For instance, objects such as watches are often the result of the labour of groups of individuals. Thus, the reasoning used by the teleological argument would seem to agree with polytheism.

== False analogy ==
A false analogy is an informal fallacy, or a faulty instance, of the argument from analogy.

An argument from analogy is weakened if it is inadequate in any of the above respects. The term false analogy comes from the philosopher John Stuart Mill, who was one of the first individuals to examine analogical reasoning in detail. One of Mill's examples involved an inference that a person is lazy from the observation that his or her sibling is lazy. According to Mill, sharing parents is not at all relevant to the property of laziness (although this in particular is an example of a faulty generalisation rather than a false analogy).

1. Planets in a planetary system orbit a star.
2. Electrons in an atom orbit a nucleus, and electrons jump instantly from orbit to orbit.
3. Therefore, planets in a planetary system jump instantly from orbit to orbit.

This is a false analogy because it fails to account for the relevant differences between a planetary system and an atom.

== Analogy blindness ==
Analogy blindness refers to the informal fallacy of misinterpretation of analogical reasoning, specifically when individuals mistakenly dismiss valid analogical comparisons. This cognitive error occurs when a person incorrectly perceives an analogy as an assertion of complete equivalence between two subjects, overlooking the nuanced, limited, or abstract similarities the analogy intends to highlight. Analogy blindness leads to the rejection of analogies based on surface-level differences, ignoring deeper structural or thematic parallels. This can limit understanding and hinder the meaningful exploration of ideas.

Ben Kling gave the example of analogy blindness in the case of comparison between a volcano and a geyser. A person objects to the analogy by complaining that one spits water and the other gushes magma and has killed people. In doing so they dismiss the similarities—both geological and thermodynamic—and so limit their understanding of both things.

The term encourages recognition of the complexities in analogical reasoning, promoting a more nuanced analysis of comparisons. The concept is associated with misunderstanding metaphor and special pleading.

== See also ==
- Case-based reasoning
- Casuistry
- Conversation theory § Analogy
- Defeasible reasoning
- Jurisprudence
- Problem of induction
- Special pleading
