= Pettifogger =

Pettifogger may refer to:

- Larsen E. Pettifogger, a character in the comic strip The Wizard of Id
- The Pettifogger, a 2011 film from Lewis Klahr

== See also ==
- Gaming the system
- Trivial objections
