= Overwhelming exception =

Informal fallacy of generalization

An overwhelming exception is an informal fallacy of generalization. It is a generalization that is accurate, but comes with one or more qualifications which eliminate so many cases that what remains is much less impressive than the initial statement might have led one to believe.

== Examples ==
- "Our foreign policy has always helped other countries, except of course when it is against our National Interest..."

The false implication is that their foreign policy always helps other countries.

The rhetorical use of the fallacy can be used to comic effect, as in the below examples:

- "All right, but apart from the sanitation, the medicine, education, wine, public order, irrigation, roads, a fresh water system, and public health, what have the Romans ever done for us?!" – Monty Python's Life of Brian

The attempted implication (fallacious in this case) is that the Romans did nothing for them.

- "Well, I promise the answer will always be yes. Unless no is required." – Madagascar: Escape 2 Africa
- "Any customer can have a car painted any color that he wants so long as it is black." – My Life and Work by Henry Ford

== See also ==
- Faulty generalization – other fallacies involving generalization
