= Inductive reasoning =

Method of logical reasoning

Inductive reasoning refers to a variety of methods of reasoning in which the conclusion of an argument is supported with some degree of probability, but not deductive certainty. Unlike deductive reasoning (such as mathematical induction), where the conclusion is certain, given the premises are correct, inductive reasoning produces conclusions that are at best probable, given the premises provided.

== Types ==
The types of inductive reasoning include generalization, prediction, statistical syllogism, argument from analogy, and causal inference. There are also differences in how their results are regarded.

=== Inductive generalization ===
A generalization (more accurately, an inductive generalization) proceeds from premises about a sample to a conclusion about the population. The observation obtained from this sample is projected onto the broader population.

The proportion Q of the sample has attribute A.
Therefore, the proportion Q of the population has attribute A.

For example, if there are 20 balls—either black or white—in an urn: to estimate their respective numbers, a sample of four balls is drawn, three are black and one is white. An inductive generalization may be that there are 15 black and five white balls in the urn. However this is only one of 17 possibilities as to the actual number of each color of balls in the urn (the population) — there may have been 19 black and just 1 white ball, or only 3 black balls and 17 white, or any mix in between. The probability of each possible distribution being the actual numbers of black and white balls can be estimated using techniques such as Bayesian inference, where prior assumptions about the distribution are updated with the observed sample, or maximum likelihood estimation (MLE), which identifies the distribution most likely given the observed sample.

How much the premises support the conclusion depends upon the number in the sample group, the number in the population, the degree to which the sample represents the population (which, for a static population, may be achieved by taking a random sample). The extent to which the sample represents the population depends on the reliability of the procedure used for individual observations, which is not always as simple as taking a random element from a static population, which in itself is not always simple. The greater the sample size relative to the population and the more closely the sample represents the population, the stronger the generalization is. The hasty generalization and the biased sample are generalization fallacies.

==== Statistical generalization ====
A statistical generalization is a type of inductive argument in which a conclusion about a population is inferred using a random sample. For example:

Of a sizeable random sample of voters surveyed, 66% support Measure Z.
Therefore, approximately 66% of voters support Measure Z.

The measure is highly reliable within a well-defined margin of error provided that the selection process was genuinely random and that the numbers of items in the sample having the properties considered are large. It is readily quantifiable. Compare the preceding argument with the following. "Six of the ten people in my book club are Libertarians. Therefore, about 60% of people are Libertarians." The argument is weak because the sample is non-random and the sample size is very small.

Statistical generalizations are also called statistical projections and sample projections.

==== Anecdotal generalization ====
An anecdotal generalization is a type of inductive argument in which a conclusion about a population is inferred using a non-statistical sample. In other words, the generalization is based on anecdotal evidence. For example:

So far, this year his son's Little League team has won 6 of 10 games.
Therefore, by season's end, they will have won about 60% of the games.

This inference is less reliable (and thus more likely to commit the fallacy of hasty generalization) than a statistical generalization, first, because the sample events are non-random, and second because it is not reducible to a mathematical expression. Statistically speaking, there is simply no way to know, measure and calculate the circumstances affecting performance that will occur in the future. On a philosophical level, the argument relies on the presupposition that the operation of future events will mirror the past. In other words, it takes for granted a uniformity of nature, an unproven principle that cannot be derived from the empirical data itself. Arguments that tacitly presuppose this uniformity are sometimes called Humean after the philosopher who was first to subject them to philosophical scrutiny.

=== Prediction ===
An inductive prediction draws a conclusion about a future, current, or past instance from a sample of other instances. Like an inductive generalization, an inductive prediction relies on a data set consisting of specific instances of a phenomenon. But rather than conclude with a general statement, the inductive prediction concludes with a specific statement about the probability that a single instance will (or will not) have an attribute shared (or not shared) by the other instances.

Proportion Q of observed members of group G have had attribute A.
Therefore, there is a probability corresponding to Q that other members of group G will have attribute A when next observed.

=== Statistical syllogism ===
A statistical syllogism proceeds from a generalization about a group to a conclusion about an individual.

Proportion Q of the known instances of population P has attribute A.
Individual I is another member of P.
Therefore, there is a probability corresponding to Q that I has A.

For example:

90% of graduates from Excelsior Preparatory school go on to university.
Bob is a graduate of Excelsior Preparatory school.
Therefore, Bob will probably go on to university.

This is a statistical syllogism. Even though one cannot be sure Bob will attend university, the exact probability of this outcome is fully assured (given no further information). Two dicto simpliciter fallacies can occur in statistical syllogisms: "accident" and "converse accident".

=== Argument from analogy ===
The process of analogical inference involves noting the shared properties of two or more things and from this basis inferring that they also share some further property:

P and Q are similar with respect to properties a, b, and c.
Object P has been observed to have further property x.
Therefore, Q probably has property x also.

Analogical reasoning is very frequent in common sense, science, philosophy, law, and the humanities, but sometimes it is accepted only as an auxiliary method. A refined approach is case-based reasoning.

Rock A and Rock B are both igneous rocks often containing veins of quartz and are most commonly found in South America in areas of ancient volcanic activity.
Rock A is also a soft stone suitable for carving into jewelry.
Therefore, Rock B is probably a soft stone suitable for carving into jewelry.

This is analogical induction, according to which things alike in certain ways are more prone to be alike in other ways. This form of induction was explored in detail by philosopher John Stuart Mill in his System of Logic, where he states, "[t]here can be no doubt that every resemblance [not known to be irrelevant] affords some degree of probability, beyond what would otherwise exist, in favor of the conclusion." See Mill's Methods.

Some thinkers contend that analogical induction is a subcategory of inductive generalization because it assumes a pre-established uniformity governing events. Analogical induction requires an auxiliary examination of the relevancy of the characteristics cited as common to the pair. In the preceding example, if a premise were added stating that both stones were mentioned in the records of early Spanish explorers, this common attribute is extraneous to the stones and does not contribute to their probable affinity.

A pitfall of analogy is that features can be cherry-picked: while objects may show striking similarities, two things juxtaposed may respectively possess other characteristics not identified in the analogy that are characteristics sharply dissimilar. Thus, analogy can mislead if not all relevant comparisons are made.

=== Causal inference ===
A causal inference draws a conclusion about a possible or probable causal connection based on the conditions of the occurrence of an effect. Premises about the correlation of two things can indicate a causal relationship between them, but additional factors must be confirmed to establish the exact form of the causal relationship.

== Methods ==
The two principal methods used to reach inductive generalizations are enumerative induction and eliminative induction.

=== Enumerative induction ===
Enumerative induction is an inductive method in which a generalization is constructed based on the number of instances that support it. The more supporting instances, the stronger the conclusion.

The most basic form of enumerative induction reasons from particular instances to all instances and is thus an unrestricted generalization. If one observes 100 swans, and all 100 were white, one might infer a probable universal categorical proposition of the form All swans are white. As this reasoning form's premises, even if true, do not entail the conclusion's truth, this is a form of inductive inference. The conclusion might be true, and might be thought probably true, yet it can be false. Questions regarding the justification and form of enumerative inductions have been central in philosophy of science, as enumerative induction has a pivotal role in the traditional model of the scientific method.

All life forms so far discovered are composed of cells.
Therefore, all life forms are composed of cells.

This is enumerative induction, also known as simple induction or simple predictive induction. It is a subcategory of inductive generalization. In everyday practice, this is perhaps the most common form of induction. For the preceding argument, the conclusion is tempting but makes a prediction well in excess of the evidence. First, it assumes that life forms observed until now can tell us how future cases will be: an appeal to uniformity. Second, the conclusion All is a bold assertion. A single contrary instance foils the argument. And last, quantifying the level of probability in any mathematical form is problematic. By what standard do we measure our Earthly sample of known life against all (possible) life? Suppose we do discover some new organism—such as some microorganism floating in the mesosphere or an asteroid—and it is cellular. Does the addition of this corroborating evidence oblige us to raise our probability assessment for the subject proposition? It is generally deemed reasonable to answer this question "yes", and for a good many this "yes" is not only reasonable but incontrovertible. So then just how much should this new data change our probability assessment? Here, consensus melts away, and in its place arises a question about whether we can talk of probability coherently at all with or without numerical quantification.

All life forms so far discovered have been composed of cells.
Therefore, the next life form discovered will be composed of cells.

This is enumerative induction in its weak form. It truncates "all" to a mere single instance and, by making a far weaker claim, considerably strengthens the probability of its conclusion. Otherwise, it has the same shortcomings as the strong form: its sample population is non-random, and quantification methods are elusive.

=== Eliminative induction ===
Eliminative induction, also called variative induction, is an inductive method first put forth by Francis Bacon; in it a generalization is constructed based on the variety of instances that support it. Unlike enumerative induction, eliminative induction reasons based on the various kinds of instances that support a conclusion, rather than the number of instances that support it. As the variety of instances increases, the more possible conclusions based on those instances can be identified as incompatible and eliminated. This, in turn, increases the strength of any conclusion that remains consistent with the various instances. In this context, confidence is the function of how many instances have been identified as incompatible and eliminated. This confidence is expressed as the Baconian probability in (read as "i out of n") where n reasons for finding a claim incompatible has been identified and i of these have been eliminated by evidence or argument.

There are three ways of attacking an argument; these ways - known as defeaters in defeasible reasoning literature - are: rebutting, undermining, and undercutting. Rebutting defeats by offering a counterexample, undermining defeats by questioning the validity of the evidence, and undercutting defeats by pointing out conditions where a conclusion is not true when the inference is. By identifying defeaters and proving them wrong, is how this approach builds confidence.

This type of induction may use different methodologies such as quasi-experimentation, which tests and, where possible, eliminates rival hypotheses. Different evidential tests may also be employed to eliminate possibilities that are entertained.

Eliminative induction is crucial to the scientific method and is used to eliminate hypotheses that are inconsistent with observations and experiments. It focuses on possible causes instead of observed actual instances of causal connections.

Eliminative induction has also been criticised for its reliance on identifying all plausible rival hypotheses before they can be ruled out. Salmon notes that this requirement is rarely achievable in scientific practice, since new explanations may emerge even after existing alternatives have been discarded, which limits the certainty the method can provide. Torretti likewise argues that eliminative strategies face the broader problem of underdetermination, where several different hypotheses may remain compatible with the same body of evidence, making elimination incomplete unless the space of possibilities is already well defined.

== History ==
=== Ancient philosophy ===
For a move from particular to universal, Aristotle in the 300s BCE used the Greek word epagogé, which Cicero translated into the Latin word inductio.

==== Aristotle and the Peripatetic School ====
Aristotle's Posterior Analytics covers the methods of inductive proof in natural philosophy and in the social sciences. The first book of Posterior Analytics describes the nature and science of demonstration and its elements: including definition, division, intuitive reason of first principles, particular and universal demonstration, affirmative and negative demonstration, the difference between science and opinion, etc.

==== Pyrrhonism ====
The ancient Pyrrhonists were the first Western philosophers to point out the problem of induction: that induction cannot, according to them, justify the acceptance of universal statements as true.

==== Ancient medicine ====
The Empiric school of ancient Greek medicine employed epilogism as a method of inference. 'Epilogism' is a theory-free method that looks at history through the accumulation of facts without major generalization and with consideration of the consequences of making causal claims. Epilogism is an inference which moves entirely within the domain of visible and evident things, it tries not to invoke unobservables.

The Dogmatic school of ancient Greek medicine employed analogismos as a method of inference. This method used analogy to reason from what was observed to unobservable forces.

=== Early modern philosophy ===
In 1620, early modern philosopher Francis Bacon repudiated the value of mere experience and enumerative induction alone. His method of inductivism required that minute and many-varied observations that uncovered the natural world's structure and causal relations needed to be coupled with enumerative induction in order to have knowledge beyond the present scope of experience. Inductivism therefore required enumerative induction as a component.

==== David Hume ====
The empiricist David Hume's 1740 stance found enumerative induction to have no rational, let alone logical, basis; instead, induction was the product of instinct rather than reason, a custom of the mind and an everyday requirement to live. While observations, such as the motion of the sun, could be coupled with the principle of the uniformity of nature to produce conclusions that seemed to be certain, the problem of induction arose from the fact that the uniformity of nature was not a logically valid principle, therefore it could not be defended as deductively rational, but also could not be defended as inductively rational by appealing to the fact that the uniformity of nature has accurately described the past and therefore, will likely accurately describe the future because that is an inductive argument and therefore circular since induction is what needs to be justified.

Since Hume first wrote about the dilemma between the invalidity of deductive arguments and the circularity of inductive arguments in support of the uniformity of nature, this supposed dichotomy between merely two modes of inference, deduction and induction, has been contested with the discovery of a third mode of inference known as abduction, or abductive reasoning, which was first formulated and advanced by Charles Sanders Peirce, in 1886, where he referred to it as "reasoning by hypothesis." Inference to the best explanation is often, yet arguably, treated as synonymous to abduction as it was first identified by Gilbert Harman in 1965 where he referred to it as "abductive reasoning," yet his definition of abduction slightly differs from Pierce's definition. Regardless, if abduction is in fact a third mode of inference rationally independent from the other two, then either the uniformity of nature can be rationally justified through abduction, or Hume's dilemma is more of a trilemma. Hume was also skeptical of the application of enumerative induction and reason to reach certainty about unobservables and especially the inference of causality from the fact that modifying an aspect of a relationship prevents or produces a particular outcome.

==== Immanuel Kant ====
Awakened from "dogmatic slumber" by a German translation of Hume's work, Kant sought to explain the possibility of metaphysics. In 1781, Kant's Critique of Pure Reason introduced rationalism as a path toward knowledge distinct from empiricism. Kant sorted statements into two types. Analytic statements are true by virtue of the arrangement of their terms and meanings, thus analytic statements are tautologies, merely logical truths, true by necessity. Whereas synthetic statements hold meanings to refer to states of facts, contingencies. Against both rationalist philosophers like Descartes and Leibniz as well as against empiricist philosophers like Locke and Hume, Kant's Critique of Pure Reason is a sustained argument that in order to have knowledge we need both a contribution of our mind (concepts) as well as a contribution of our senses (intuitions). Knowledge proper is for Kant thus restricted to what we can possibly perceive (phenomena), whereas objects of mere thought ("things in themselves") are in principle unknowable due to the impossibility of ever perceiving them.

Reasoning that the mind must contain its own categories for organizing sense data, making experience of objects in space and time (phenomena) possible, Kant concluded that the uniformity of nature was an a priori truth. A class of synthetic statements that was not contingent but true by necessity, was then synthetic a priori. Kant thus saved both metaphysics and Newton's law of universal gravitation. On the basis of the argument that what goes beyond our knowledge is "nothing to us," he discarded scientific realism. Kant's position that knowledge comes about by a cooperation of perception and our capacity to think (transcendental idealism) gave birth to the movement of German idealism. Hegel's absolute idealism subsequently flourished across continental Europe and England.

=== Late modern philosophy ===
Positivism, developed by Henri de Saint-Simon and promulgated in the 1830s by his former student Auguste Comte, was the first late modern philosophy of science. In the aftermath of the French Revolution, fearing society's ruin, Comte opposed metaphysics. Human knowledge had evolved from religion to metaphysics to science, said Comte, which had flowed from mathematics to astronomy to physics to chemistry to biology to sociology—in that order—describing increasingly intricate domains. All of society's knowledge had become scientific, with questions of theology and of metaphysics being unanswerable. Comte found enumerative induction reliable as a consequence of its grounding in available experience. He asserted the use of science, rather than metaphysical truth, as the correct method for the improvement of human society.

According to Comte, scientific method frames predictions, confirms them, and states laws—positive statements—irrefutable by theology or by metaphysics. Regarding experience as justifying enumerative induction by demonstrating the uniformity of nature, the British philosopher John Stuart Mill welcomed Comte's positivism, but thought scientific laws susceptible to recall or revision and Mill also withheld from Comte's Religion of Humanity. Comte was confident in treating scientific law as an irrefutable foundation for all knowledge, and believed that churches, honouring eminent scientists, ought to focus public mindset on altruism—a term Comte coined—to apply science for humankind's social welfare via sociology, Comte's leading science.

During the 1830s and 1840s, while Comte and Mill were the leading philosophers of science, William Whewell found enumerative induction not nearly as convincing, and, despite the dominance of inductivism, formulated "superinduction". Whewell argued that "the peculiar import of the term Induction" should be recognised: "there is some Conception superinduced upon the facts", that is, "the Invention of a new Conception in every inductive inference". The creation of Conceptions is easily overlooked and prior to Whewell was rarely recognised. Whewell explained:

"Although we bind together facts by superinducing upon them a new Conception, this Conception, once introduced and applied, is looked upon as inseparably connected with the facts, and necessarily implied in them. Having once had the phenomena bound together in their minds in virtue of the Conception, men can no longer easily restore them back to detached and incoherent condition in which they were before they were thus combined."

These "superinduced" explanations may well be flawed, but their accuracy is suggested when they exhibit what Whewell termed consilience—that is, simultaneously predicting the inductive generalizations in multiple areas—a feat that, according to Whewell, can establish their truth. Perhaps to accommodate the prevailing view of science as inductivist method, Whewell devoted several chapters to "methods of induction" and sometimes used the phrase "logic of induction", despite the fact that induction lacks rules and cannot be trained.

In the 1870s, the originator of pragmatism, C S Peirce performed vast investigations that clarified the basis of deductive inference as a mathematical proof (as, independently, did Gottlob Frege). Peirce recognized induction but always insisted on a third type of inference that Peirce variously termed abduction or retroduction or hypothesis or presumption. Later philosophers termed Peirce's abduction, etc., Inference to the Best Explanation (IBE).

=== Contemporary philosophy ===
==== Bertrand Russell ====
Having highlighted Hume's problem of induction, John Maynard Keynes posed logical probability as its answer, or as near a solution as he could arrive at. Bertrand Russell found Keynes's Treatise on Probability the best examination of induction, and believed that if read with Jean Nicod's Le Probleme logique de l'induction as well as R B Braithwaite's review of Keynes's work in the October 1925 issue of Mind, that would cover "most of what is known about induction", although the "subject is technical and difficult, involving a good deal of mathematics". Two decades later, Russell followed Keynes in regarding enumerative induction as an "independent logical principle". Russell found:

"Hume's skepticism rests entirely upon his rejection of the principle of induction. The principle of induction, as applied to causation, says that, if A has been found very often accompanied or followed by B, then it is probable that on the next occasion on which A is observed, it will be accompanied or followed by B. If the principle is to be adequate, a sufficient number of instances must make the probability not far short of certainty. If this principle, or any other from which it can be deduced, is true, then the casual inferences which Hume rejects are valid, not indeed as giving certainty, but as giving a sufficient probability for practical purposes. If this principle is not true, every attempt to arrive at general scientific laws from particular observations is fallacious, and Hume's skepticism is inescapable for an empiricist. The principle itself cannot, of course, without circularity, be inferred from observed uniformities, since it is required to justify any such inference. It must, therefore, be, or be deduced from, an independent principle not based on experience. To this extent, Hume has proved that pure empiricism is not a sufficient basis for science. But if this one principle is admitted, everything else can proceed in accordance with the theory that all our knowledge is based on experience. It must be granted that this is a serious departure from pure empiricism, and that those who are not empiricists may ask why, if one departure is allowed, others are forbidden. These, however, are not questions directly raised by Hume's arguments. What these arguments prove—and I do not think the proof can be controverted—is that induction is an independent logical principle, incapable of being inferred either from experience or from other logical principles, and that without this principle, science is impossible."

==== Gilbert Harman ====
In a 1965 paper, Gilbert Harman explained that enumerative induction is not an autonomous phenomenon, but is simply a disguised consequence of Inference to the Best Explanation (IBE). IBE is otherwise synonymous with C S Peirce's abduction. Many philosophers of science espousing scientific realism have maintained that IBE is the way that scientists develop approximately true scientific theories about nature.

== Comparison with deductive reasoning ==
Argument terminology

Inductive reasoning is a form of argument that—in contrast to deductive reasoning—allows for the possibility that a conclusion can be false, even if all of the premises are true. This difference between deductive and inductive reasoning is reflected in the terminology used to describe deductive and inductive arguments. In deductive reasoning, an argument is "valid" when, assuming the argument's premises are true, the conclusion must be true. If the argument is valid and the premises are true, then the argument is "sound". In contrast, in inductive reasoning, an argument's premises can never guarantee that the conclusion must be true. Instead, an argument is "strong" when, assuming the argument's premises are true, the conclusion is probably true. If the argument is strong and the premises are thought to be true, then the argument is said to be "cogent". Less formally, the conclusion of an inductive argument may be called "probable", "plausible", "likely", "reasonable", or "justified", but never "certain" or "necessary". Logic affords no bridge from the probable to the certain.

The futility of attaining certainty through some critical mass of probability can be illustrated with a coin-toss exercise. Suppose someone tests whether a coin is either a fair one or two-headed. They flip the coin ten times, and ten times it comes up heads. At this point, there is a strong reason to believe it is two-headed. After all, the chance of ten heads in a row is .000976: less than one in one thousand. Then, after 100 flips, every toss has come up heads. Now there is "virtual" certainty that the coin is two-headed, and one can regard it as "true" that the coin is probably two-headed. Still, one can neither logically nor empirically rule out that the next toss will produce tails. No matter how many times in a row it comes up heads, this remains the case. If one programmed a machine to flip a coin over and over continuously, at some point the result would be a string of 100 heads. In the fullness of time, all combinations will appear.

As for the slim prospect of getting ten out of ten heads from a fair coin—the outcome that made the coin appear biased—many may be surprised to learn that the chance of any sequence of heads or tails is equally unlikely (e.g., H-H-T-T-H-T-H-H-H-T) and yet it occurs in every trial of ten tosses. That means all results for ten tosses have the same probability as getting ten out of ten heads, which is 0.000976. If one records the heads-tails sequences, for whatever result, that exact sequence had a chance of 0.000976.

An argument is deductive when the conclusion is necessary given the premises. That is, the conclusion must be true if the premises are true. For example, after getting 10 heads in a row one might deduce that the coin had met some statistical criterion to be regarded as probably two-sided, a conclusion that would not be falsified even if the next toss yielded tails.

If a deductive conclusion follows duly from its premises, then it is valid; otherwise, it is invalid (that an argument is invalid is not to say its conclusions are false; it may have a true conclusion, just not on account of the premises). An examination of the following examples will show that the relationship between premises and conclusion is such that the truth of the conclusion is already implicit in the premises. Bachelors are unmarried because we say they are; we have defined them so. Socrates is mortal because we have included him in a set of beings that are mortal. The conclusion for a valid deductive argument is already contained in the premises since its truth is strictly a matter of logical relations. It cannot say more than its premises. Inductive premises, on the other hand, draw their substance from fact and evidence, and the conclusion accordingly makes a factual claim or prediction. Its reliability varies proportionally with the evidence. Induction wants to reveal something new about the world. One could say that induction wants to say more than is contained in the premises.

To better see the difference between inductive and deductive arguments, consider that it would not make sense to say: "all rectangles so far examined have four right angles, so the next one I see will have four right angles." This would treat logical relations as something factual and discoverable, and thus variable and uncertain. Likewise, speaking deductively we may permissibly say. "All unicorns can fly; I have a unicorn named Charlie; thus Charlie can fly." This deductive argument is valid because the logical relations hold; we are not interested in their factual soundness.

The conclusions of inductive reasoning are inherently uncertain. It only deals with the extent to which, given the premises, the conclusion is "credible" according to some theory of evidence. Examples include a many-valued logic, Dempster–Shafer theory, or probability theory with rules for inference such as Bayes' rule. Unlike deductive reasoning, it does not rely on universals holding over a closed domain of discourse to draw conclusions, so it can be applicable even in cases of epistemic uncertainty (technical issues with this may arise however; for example, the second axiom of probability is a closed-world assumption).

Another crucial difference between these two types of argument is that deductive certainty is impossible in non-axiomatic or empirical systems such as reality, leaving inductive reasoning as the primary route to (probabilistic) knowledge of such systems.

Given that "if A is true then that would cause B, C, and D to be true", an example of deduction would be "A is true therefore we can deduce that B, C, and D are true". An example of induction would be "B, C, and D are observed to be true therefore A might be true". A is a reasonable explanation for B, C, and D being true.

For example:

A large enough asteroid impact would create a very large crater and cause a severe impact winter that could drive the non-avian dinosaurs to extinction.
We observe that there is a very large crater in the Gulf of Mexico dating to very near the time of the extinction of the non-avian dinosaurs.
Therefore, it is possible that this impact could explain why the non-avian dinosaurs became extinct.

Note, however, that the asteroid explanation for the mass extinction is not necessarily correct. Other events with the potential to affect global climate also coincide with the extinction of the non-avian dinosaurs. For example, the release of volcanic gases (particularly sulfur dioxide) during the formation of the Deccan Traps in India.

Another example of an inductive argument:

All biological life forms that we know of depend on liquid water to exist.
Therefore, if we discover a new biological life form, it will probably depend on liquid water to exist.

This argument could have been made every time a new biological life form was found, and would have had a correct conclusion every time; however, it is still possible that in the future a biological life form not requiring liquid water could be discovered. As a result, the argument may be stated as:

All biological life forms that we know of depend on liquid water to exist.
Therefore, all biological life probably depends on liquid water to exist.

A classical example of an "incorrect" statistical syllogism was presented by John Vickers:

All of the swans we have seen are white.
Therefore, we "know" that all swans are white.

The conclusion fails because the population of swans then known was not actually representative of all swans. A more reasonable conclusion would be: in line with applicable conventions, we might reasonably expect all swans in England to be white, at least in the short-term.

Succinctly put: deduction is about certainty/necessity; induction is about probability. Any single assertion will answer to one of these two criteria. Another approach to the analysis of reasoning is that of modal logic, which deals with the distinction between the necessary and the possible in a way not concerned with probabilities among things deemed possible.

The philosophical definition of inductive reasoning is more nuanced than a simple progression from particular/individual instances to broader generalizations. Rather, the premises of an inductive logical argument indicate some degree of support (inductive probability) for the conclusion but do not entail it; that is, they suggest truth but do not ensure it. In this manner, there is the possibility of moving from general statements to individual instances (for example, statistical syllogisms).

Note that the definition of inductive reasoning described here differs from mathematical induction, which, in fact, is a form of deductive reasoning. Mathematical induction is used to provide strict proofs of the properties of recursively defined sets. The deductive nature of mathematical induction derives from its basis in a non-finite number of cases, in contrast with the finite number of cases involved in an enumerative induction procedure like proof by exhaustion. Both mathematical induction and proof by exhaustion are examples of complete induction. Complete induction is a masked type of deductive reasoning.

== Problem of induction ==
Although philosophers at least as far back as the Pyrrhonist philosopher Sextus Empiricus have pointed out the unsoundness of inductive reasoning, the classic philosophical critique of the problem of induction was given by the Scottish philosopher David Hume. Although the use of inductive reasoning demonstrates considerable success, the justification for its application has been questionable. Recognizing this, Hume highlighted the fact that our mind often draws conclusions from relatively limited experiences that appear correct but which are actually far from certain. In deduction, the truth value of the conclusion is based on the truth of the premise. In induction, however, the dependence of the conclusion on the premise is always uncertain. For example, let us assume that all ravens are black. The fact that there are numerous black ravens supports the assumption. Our assumption, however, becomes invalid once it is discovered that there are white ravens. Therefore, the general rule "all ravens are black" is not the kind of statement that can ever be certain. Hume further argued that it is impossible to justify inductive reasoning: this is because it cannot be justified deductively, so our only option is to justify it inductively. Since this argument is circular, with the help of Hume's fork he concluded that our use of induction is not logically justifiable.

Hume nevertheless stated that even if induction were proved unreliable, we would still have to rely on it. So instead of a position of severe skepticism, Hume advocated a practical skepticism based on common sense, where the inevitability of induction is accepted. Bertrand Russell illustrated Hume's skepticism in a story about a chicken who, fed every morning without fail and following the laws of induction, concluded that this feeding would always continue, until his throat was eventually cut by the farmer.

In 1963, Karl Popper wrote, "Induction, i.e. inference based on many observations, is a myth. It is neither a psychological fact, nor a fact of ordinary life, nor one of scientific procedure." Popper's 1972 book Objective Knowledge—whose first chapter is devoted to the problem of induction—opens, "I think I have solved a major philosophical problem: the problem of induction". In Popper's schema, enumerative induction is "a kind of optical illusion" cast by the steps of conjecture and refutation during a problem shift. An imaginative leap, the tentative solution is improvised, lacking inductive rules to guide it. The resulting, unrestricted generalization is deductive, an entailed consequence of all explanatory considerations. Controversy continued, however, with Popper's putative solution not generally accepted.

Donald A. Gillies argues that rules of inferences related to inductive reasoning are overwhelmingly absent from science, and describes most scientific inferences as "involv[ing] conjectures thought up by human ingenuity and creativity, and by no means inferred in any mechanical fashion, or according to precisely specified rules." Gillies also provides a rare counterexample "in the machine learning programs of AI."

=== Biases ===
Inductive reasoning is also known as hypothesis construction because any conclusions made are based on current knowledge and predictions. As with deductive arguments, biases can distort the proper application of inductive argument, thereby preventing the reasoner from forming the most logical conclusion based on the clues. Examples of these biases include the availability heuristic, confirmation bias, and the predictable-world bias.

The availability heuristic is regarded as causing the reasoner to depend primarily upon information that is readily available. People have a tendency to rely on information that is easily accessible in the world around them. For example, in surveys, when people are asked to estimate the percentage of people who died from various causes, most respondents choose the causes that have been most prevalent in the media such as terrorism, murders, and airplane accidents, rather than causes such as disease and traffic accidents, which have been technically "less accessible" to the individual since they are not emphasized as heavily in the world around them.

Confirmation bias is based on the natural tendency to confirm rather than deny a hypothesis. Research has demonstrated that people are inclined to seek solutions to problems that are more consistent with known hypotheses rather than attempt to refute those hypotheses. Often, in experiments, subjects will ask questions that seek answers that fit established hypotheses, thus confirming these hypotheses. For example, if it is hypothesized that Sally is a sociable individual, subjects will naturally seek to confirm the premise by asking questions that would produce answers confirming that Sally is, in fact, a sociable individual.

The predictable-world bias revolves around the inclination to perceive order where it has not been proved to exist, either at all or at a particular level of abstraction. Gambling, for example, is one of the most popular examples of predictable-world bias. Gamblers often begin to think that they see simple and obvious patterns in the outcomes and therefore believe that they are able to predict outcomes based on what they have witnessed. In reality, however, the outcomes of these games are difficult to predict and highly complex in nature. In general, people tend to seek some type of simplistic order to explain or justify their beliefs and experiences, and it is often difficult for them to realise that their perceptions of order may be entirely different from the truth.

== Bayesian inference ==
As a logic of induction rather than a theory of belief, Bayesian inference does not determine which beliefs are a priori rational, but rather determines how we should rationally change the beliefs we have when presented with evidence. We begin by considering an exhaustive list of possibilities, a definite probabilistic characterisation of each of them (in terms of likelihoods) and precise prior probabilities for them (e.g. based on logic or induction from previous experience) and, when faced with evidence, we adjust the strength of our belief in the given hypotheses in a precise manner using Bayesian logic to yield candidate 'a posteriori probabilities', taking no account of the extent to which the new evidence may happen to give us specific reasons to doubt our assumptions. Otherwise it is advisable to review and repeat as necessary the consideration of possibilities and their characterisation until, perhaps, a stable situation is reached.

== Inductive inference ==
Around 1960, Ray Solomonoff founded the theory of universal inductive inference, a theory of prediction based on observations, for example, predicting the next symbol based upon a given series of symbols. This is a formal inductive framework that combines algorithmic information theory with the Bayesian framework. Universal inductive inference is based on solid philosophical foundations and 'seems to be an inadequate tool for dealing with any reasonably complex or real-world environment', and can be considered as a mathematically formalized Occam's razor. Fundamental ingredients of the theory are the concepts of algorithmic probability and Kolmogorov complexity.

Inductive inference typically considers hypothesis classes with a countable size. A recent advance established a sufficient and necessary condition for inductive inference: a finite error bound is guaranteed if and only if the hypothesis class is a countable union of online learnable classes. Notably, this condition allows the hypothesis class to have an uncountable size while remaining learnable within this framework.

== See also ==
- Analogy
- Argument
- Argumentation theory
- Bayesian probability
- Counterinduction
- Explanation
- Failure mode and effects analysis
- Falsifiability
- Grammar induction
- Inductive logic programming
- Inductive probability
- Inductive programming
- Inductive reasoning aptitude
- Inductivism
- Inquiry
- Intuitive statistics
- Lateral thinking
- Laurence Jonathan Cohen
- Logic
- Logical reasoning
- Logical positivism
- Marcus Hutter
- Minimum description length
- Minimum message length
- New riddle of induction
- Open world assumption
- Plausible reasoning
- Raven paradox
- Recursive Bayesian estimation
- Statistical inference
- Stephen Toulmin
