= Slothful induction =

Logical fallacy

Slothful induction, also called appeal to coincidence, is a fallacy in which an inductive argument is denied its proper conclusion, despite strong evidence for inference. An example of slothful induction might be that of a careless man who has had twelve accidents in the last six months, and it is strongly evident that they were due to his negligence or rashness, yet he keeps insisting that it is just a coincidence and not his fault. Its logical form is: evidence suggests X results in Y, yet the person in question insists Y was caused by something else.

Its opposite fallacy (which perhaps occurs more often) is called hasty generalization.
