= Homoeomeria (philosophy) =

Homoeomeria was a doctrine in the philosophy of the ancient Greek Anaxagoras, as claimed by the Roman atomist Lucretius. It was assumed that the atoms constituting a substance must themselves have the salient observed properties of that substance: so atoms of water would be wet, atoms of iron would be hard, atoms of wool would be soft, etc. This doctrine depends on the fallacy of division.

Professor Fleeming Jenkin wrote that: "we may with the exercise of a good deal of fancy see in the doctrine of homoeomeria, which taught that all things contained the materials of everything else in a latent state, a foreshadowing of the chemical theory which proves that our bodies are made of the same chemical materials as peas, cabbages, &c., but it requires an elastic imagination to link the old and new creed together."
