= Trivial objections =

Fallacy in informal logic

Trivial objections (also referred to as pilpul, hair-splitting, nothing but objections, barrage of objections and banal objections) is an informal logical fallacy where irrelevant and sometimes frivolous objections are made to divert the attention away from the topic that is being discussed. This type of argument is called a "quibble" or "quillet". Trivial objections are a special case of red herring. A person engaging in this logical fallacy could also be considered pedantic.

The fallacy often arises when an argument is difficult to refute. The person making a trivial objection may seem willing to accept the argument, but simultaneously undermines it through numerous minor or irrelevant criticisms. These objections can appear in the form of lists, hypotheticals, and even accusations.

Such objections themselves may be valid, but they fail to confront the main argument under consideration. Instead, the objection opposes a small, irrelevant part of the main argument. The fallacy is committed due to this diversion, as it is flawed reasoning to oppose a point based on minor or incidental aspects instead of addressing the central claim directly.

These objections are often used to not address the merit of an argument but rather to oppose them from a technicality.

== See also ==
- Red herring
- Straw man
