= Pooh-pooh =

Fallacy in informal logic

To pooh-pooh an argument is to dismiss it as being unworthy of serious consideration. It is an informal fallacy.

Scholars generally characterize the fallacy as a rhetorical device in which the speaker ridicules an argument without responding to the substance of the argument.

Some authors have also described the fallacy as the act of "ridicul[ing]" an argument as though it were "a myth", and some characterize it as the act of dismissing an argument "with insults without responding to its substance in any way". Other authors describe the fallacy as the act of dismissing an argument "with the wave of a hand". Some sources also suggest the fallacy is an expression that involves "sneer[ing]", "ridicule", or "malicious comments about the proponent of the argument". Some authors also suggest the term originated as a "representation of the act of spitting in sign of contemptuous rejection".

== See also ==
- Hasty generalization
- Appeal to ridicule
- List of fallacies
