= Counterinduction =

In logic, counterinduction is the practice of elaborating a paradigm that contradicts and helps to question the current one by comparison. Paul Feyerabend argued for counterinduction as a way to test unchallenged scientific theories; unchallenged simply because there are no structures within the scientific paradigm to challenge itself (See Crotty, 1998 p. 39). For instance, Feyerabend is quoted as saying the following:

"Therefore, the first step in our criticism of customary concepts and customary reactions is to step outside the circle and either to invent a new conceptual system, for example, a new theory, that clashes with the most carefully established observational results and confounds the most plausible theoretical principles, or to import such a system from the outside science, from religion, from mythology, from the ideas of incompetents, or the ramblings of madmen." (Feyerabend, 1993, pp. 52-3)

This gets into the pluralistic methodology that Feyerabend espouses that will help support counterinductive methods. Paul Feyerabend's anarchist theory popularized the notion of counterinduction.

Most of the time when counterinduction is mentioned, it is not presented as a valid rule. Instead, it is given as a refutation of Max Black's proposed inductive justification of induction, since the counterinductive justification of counterinduction is formally identical to the inductive justification of induction. For further information, see Problem of induction.

== See also ==
- A priori and a posteriori – Two types of knowledge, justification, or argument
- Abductive reasoning – Inference seeking the simplest and most likely explanation
- Bayesian inference – Method of statistical inference
- Hasty generalization – Conclusion made on the basis of one or few instances of a phenomenon
- Justified true belief – Proposed definitions of knowledge
- Law of large numbers – Averages of repeated trials converge to the expected value
- Solomonoff's theory of inductive inference – A mathematical theory
