= Fallacy of accent =

Linguistic ambiguity caused by unusual stress

The fallacy of accent (also known as accentus, from its Latin denomination, and misleading accent) is a verbal fallacy that reasons from two different vocal readings of the same written words. In English, the fallacy typically relies on prosodic stress, the emphasis given to a word within a phrase, or a phrase within a sentence. The fallacy has also been extended to grammatical ambiguity caused by missing punctuation.

== History ==
Among the thirteen types of fallacies in his book Sophistical Refutations, Aristotle lists a fallacy he calls προσῳδία (prosody), later translated in Latin as accentus. He gives as an example:

So where you lodge is a house? / Yes. (Ἆρά γ´ ἐστὶ τὸ οὗ καταλύεις οἰκία; Ναί.)

And isn't "you don't lodge" the negation of "you lodge"? / Yes. (Οὐκοῦν τὸ ‘οὐ καταλύεις’ τοῦ ‘καταλύεις’ ἀπόφασις; Ναί.)

And you said that where you lodge is a house. Therefore a house is a negation. (Ἔφησας δ´ εἶναι τὸ οὗ καταλύεις οἰκίαν· ἡ οἰκία ἄρα ἀπόφασις.)

The fallacy turns here on the varying pronunciation of ου, meaning "where" in the first and third occurrences, and "not" in the second. These would later be distinguished in writing with diacritics, but they were not in Aristotle's time.

Aristotle noted that fallacies of this form were rare in contemporary Greek. They are rarer still in languages like English that have fewer heteronyms. Accordingly, English commentary has tended either to omit the fallacy or to reinterpret it as a fallacy of varying word emphasis. By varying the emphasis in "All men are created equal," for example, one might argue that men (not women) are created equal, or that men are created (but do not remain) equal. Broadening the fallacy in this manner has met with occasional criticism.

== See also ==
- Innuendo
- Syntactic ambiguity
