= Secundum quid =

Informal fallacy

Secundum quid comes from the Latin "a dicto simpliciter ad dictum secundum quid", meaning "(what is true) in a certain respect and (what is true) absolutely" or "from the statement unqualified to the statement qualified". It is a type of informal fallacy that occurs when the arguer omits the fact that a statement applies with qualifications or exceptions, or fails to recognize the difference between rules of thumb (soft generalizations, heuristics that hold true as a general rule but leave room for exceptions) and categorical propositions, rules that hold true universally.

Since it ignores the limits, or qualifications, of rules of thumb, this fallacy is also named ignoring qualifications or sweeping generalizations. The expression misuse of a principle can be used as well.

== Example ==
Let me tell you: all great composers die young. Take Mendelssohn: he was 38. Or Mozart, just 35. And Schubert! Hundreds of songs, and he was only 31.

The arguer cites only the cases that support his point, omitting counterexamples such as Bach, Beethoven, Brahms. The several cases given does not support the universal claim about "all" great composers.

== In popular culture ==
The following quatrain can be attributed to C. H. Talbot:

I talked in terms whose sense was hid,
Dividendo, componendo et secundum quid;
Now secundum quid is a wise remark
And it earned my reputation as a learned clerk.

== Two types ==
Instances of secundum quid are of two kinds:

- Accident — a dicto simpliciter ad dictum secundum quid (where an acceptable exception is ignored). This is taking the usual case and inappropriately applying it to exceptional cases. This is when one fails to list the exceptions to a claim, and then uses the claim as a generalization as if there was no exception.
- Converse accident — a dicto secundum quid ad dictum simpliciter (where an acceptable exception is eliminated or simplified). This is taking one unusual case and inappropriately applying it to all cases. This is when one focuses on one exception and use it to draw a generalization. It is close to hasty generalization.

== See also ==
- Defeasible reasoning
