= Converse accident =

Informal fallacy

The fallacy of converse accident is an informal fallacy that occurs when a rule that applies only to an exceptional case is wrongly applied to all cases in general.

== Example ==
1. The Tunguska explosion happened in Siberia.
2. Magnitogorsk Iron and Steel Works is in Siberia.
3. This is a bad company to invest in because it's just going to be destroyed by a meteorite.

"If we allow people with glaucoma to use medical marijuana, then everyone should be allowed to use marijuana."

1. People with glaucoma use marijuana.
2. People with glaucoma should be allowed to choose what substances they use.
3. Therefore, all people who use marijuana should be allowed to choose what substances they use.

== Related fallacies ==
This fallacy is similar to the slippery slope, where the opposition claims that if a restricted action under debate is allowed, such as allowing people with glaucoma to use medical marijuana, then the action will by stages become acceptable in general, such as eventually everyone being allowed to use marijuana. The two arguments imply there is no difference between the exception and the rule, and in fact fallacious slippery slope arguments often use the converse accident to the contrary as the basis for the argument. However, a key difference between the two is the point and position being argued. The above argument using converse accident is an argument for full legal use of marijuana given that glaucoma patients use it. The argument based on the slippery slope argues against medicinal use of marijuana because it will lead to full use.

The fallacy of converse accident is a form of hasty generalization. The converse form is known as the fallacy of accident.
