= Fallacy of division =

Fallacy

The fallacy of division is an informal fallacy that occurs when one reasons that something true for a whole must also be true of all or some of its parts.

For example:

1. The second grade in Jefferson Elementary eats a lot of ice cream.
2. Carlos is a second-grader in Jefferson Elementary.
3. Therefore, Carlos eats a lot of ice cream.

The converse of this fallacy is the fallacy of composition, which arises when one fallaciously attributes a property of some part of a thing to the thing as a whole.

If a system as a whole has some property that none of its constituents has (or perhaps, it has it but not as a result of some constituents having that property), this is sometimes called an emergent property of the system.

The term mereological fallacy refers to approximately the same incorrect inference that properties of a whole are also properties of its parts.

== History ==
Both the fallacy of division and the fallacy of composition were addressed by Aristotle in Sophistical Refutations.

In the philosophy of the ancient Greek Anaxagoras, as claimed by the Roman atomist Lucretius, it was assumed that the atoms constituting a substance must themselves have the salient observed properties of that substance: so atoms of water would be wet, atoms of iron would be hard, atoms of wool would be soft, etc. This doctrine is called homoeomeria, and it depends on the fallacy of division.

== Examples in statistics ==
In statistics, an ecological fallacy is a logical fallacy in the interpretation of statistical data where inferences about the nature of individuals are deduced from inference for the group to which those individuals belong. The four common statistical ecological fallacies are: confusion between ecological correlations and individual correlations, confusion between group average and total average, Simpson's paradox, and other statistical methods.

== See also ==
- Ecological fallacy
- Fallacy of composition
- Synecdoche, the figure of speech of two forms:
  - Pars pro toto using the word for a part by way of referring to the whole
  - Totum pro parte using the word for the whole by way of referring to a part
