= Faulty generalization =

Conclusion made on the basis of one or few instances of a phenomenon

A faulty generalization is an informal fallacy wherein a conclusion is drawn about all or many instances of a phenomenon on the basis of one or a few instances of that phenomenon. It is similar to a proof by example in mathematics. It is an example of jumping to conclusions. For example, one may generalize about all people or all members of a group from what one knows about just one or a few people:

- If one meets a rude person from a given country X, one may suspect that most people in country X are rude.
- If one sees only white swans, one may suspect that all swans are white.

Expressed in more precise philosophical language, a fallacy of defective induction is a conclusion that has been made on the basis of weak premises, or one which is not justified by sufficient or unbiased evidence. Unlike fallacies of relevance, in fallacies of defective induction, the premises are related to the conclusions, yet only weakly buttress the conclusions, hence a faulty generalization is produced. The essence of this inductive fallacy lies on the overestimation of an argument based on insufficiently large samples under an implied margin of error.

== Logic ==
A faulty generalization often follows the following format:

The proportion Q of the sample has attribute A.
Therefore, the proportion Q of the population has attribute A.

Such a generalization proceeds from a premise about a sample (often unrepresentative or biased), to a conclusion about the population itself.

Faulty generalization is also a mode of thinking that takes the experiences of one person or one group, and incorrectly extends it to another.

== Inductive fallacies ==
- Hasty generalization is the fallacy of examining just one or very few examples or studying a single case and generalizing that to be representative of the whole class of objects or phenomena.
- The opposite, slothful induction, is the fallacy of denying the logical conclusion of an inductive argument, dismissing an effect as "just a coincidence" when it is very likely not.
- The overwhelming exception is related to the hasty generalization but works from the other end. It is a generalization that is accurate, but tags on a qualification that eliminates enough cases (as exceptions); that what remains is much less impressive than what the original statement might have led one to assume.
- Fallacy of unrepresentative samples is a fallacy where a conclusion is drawn using samples that are unrepresentative or biased.
- Misleading vividness is a kind of hasty generalization that appeals to the senses.
- Statistical special pleading occurs when the interpretation of the relevant statistic is "massaged" by looking for ways to reclassify or requantify data from one portion of results, but not applying the same scrutiny to other categories.
- This can be considered a special case of the fallacy of composition, where the item under discussion is a group, and the fallacy is what can be derived from knowledge of part of the item.

== Hasty generalization ==
Hasty generalization is an informal fallacy of faulty generalization, which involves reaching an inductive generalization based on insufficient evidence – essentially, making a rushed conclusion without considering all the variables or enough evidence. In statistics, it may involve basing broad conclusions regarding a statistical survey from a small sample group that fails to sufficiently represent an entire population. Its opposite fallacy is called slothful induction, which consists of denying a reasonable conclusion of an inductive argument (e.g., "it was just a coincidence").

=== Examples ===
Hasty generalization usually follows the pattern:

1. X is true for A.
2. X is true for B.
3. Therefore, X is true for C, D, E, etc.

For example, if a person travels through a town for the first time and sees only a dozen people, all of them children, they may erroneously conclude that there are no adult residents in the town.

Or a person might look at a number line, and notice that the number 1 is a square number; 3 is a prime number, 5 is a prime number, and 7 is a prime number; 9 is a square number; 11 is a prime number, and 13 is a prime number. From these observations, the person might claim that all odd numbers are either prime or square, while in reality, 15 is a counterexample.

=== Alternative names ===
The fallacy is also known as:

- Black swan fallacy
- Illicit generalization
- Fallacy of insufficient sample
- Generalization from the particular
- Leaping to a conclusion
- Blanket statement
- Hasty induction
- Law of small numbers
- Unrepresentative sample
- Secundum quid

When referring to a generalization made from a single example, the terms fallacy of the lonely fact, or the fallacy of proof by example, might be used.

When evidence is intentionally excluded to bias the result, the fallacy of exclusion (a form of selection bias) is said to be involved.

== See also ==
- Accident (fallacy) – Informal fallacy
- Association fallacy – Formal fallacy
- Anecdotal evidence – Evidence relying on personal testimony
- Availability bias – Bias towards recently acquired information
- Blind men and an elephant – Parable illustrating ontological reasoning
- Cherry picking (fallacy) – Fallacy of incomplete evidence
- Cognitive distortion – Exaggerated or irrational thought pattern
- Confirmation bias – Bias confirming existing attitudes
- Converse accident – Informal fallacy
- Fallacy of composition – Fallacy of inferring on the whole from a part
- Fallacy of the single cause – Assumption of a single cause where multiple factors may be necessary
- Generalization (logic) – Rule of inference in predicate logic
- Generalization error – Measure of algorithm accuracy
- Hypercorrection – Non-standard language usage
- Package-deal fallacy – Logical fallacy
- Pooh-pooh – Fallacy in informal logic
- Problem of induction – Question of whether inductive reasoning leads to definitive knowledge
- Statistical significance – Concept in inferential statistics
- Stereotype – Generalized belief about people
- Straw man – Form of incorrect argument and informal fallacy
- Syllogism – Type of logical argument that applies deductive reasoning
