= Irrelevant conclusion =

Type of informal fallacy

An irrelevant conclusion, also known as ignoratio elenchi (Latin for 'ignoring refutation') and under other names, is the informal fallacy of presenting an argument whose conclusion fails to address the issue in question. It falls into the broad class of relevance fallacies.

The irrelevant conclusion should not be confused with formal fallacy, an argument whose conclusion does not follow from its premises; instead, it is that despite its formal consistency it is not relevant to the subject being talked about.

== Overview ==
Ignoratio elenchi is one of the fallacies identified by Aristotle in his Organon. In a broader sense he asserted that all fallacies are a form of ignoratio elenchi.

Ignoratio Elenchi, according to Aristotle, is a fallacy that arises from "ignorance of the nature of refutation". To refute an assertion, Aristotle says we must prove its contradictory; the proof, consequently, of a proposition which stood in any other relation than that to the original, would be an ignoratio elenchi. Since Aristotle, the scope of the fallacy has been extended to include all cases of proving the wrong point ... "I am required to prove a certain conclusion; I prove, not that, but one which is likely to be mistaken for it; in that lies the fallacy ... For instance, instead of proving that 'this person has committed an atrocious fraud', you prove that 'this fraud he is accused of is atrocious'"; ... The nature of the fallacy, then, consists in substituting for a certain issue another which is more or less closely related to it and arguing the substituted issue. The fallacy does not take into account whether the arguments do or do not really support the substituted issue, it only calls attention to the fact that they do not constitute proof of the original one… It is a particularly prevalent and subtle fallacy and it assumes a great variety of forms. But whenever it occurs and whatever form it takes, it is brought about by an assumption that leads the person guilty of it to substitute for a definite subject of inquiry another which is in close relation with it.

— Arthur Ernest Davies, "Fallacies" in A Text-Book of Logic

Samuel Johnson's unique "refutation" of Bishop Berkeley's immaterialism, a claim that matter did not actually exist but only seemed to exist, has been described as ignoratio elenchi: (during a conversation with Boswell, Johnson powerfully kicked a nearby stone and proclaimed of Berkeley's theory, "I refute it thus!") (See also argumentum ad lapidem.)

A related concept is that of the red herring, which is a deliberate attempt to divert a process of enquiry by changing the subject. Ignoratio elenchi is sometimes confused with straw man argument.

== Etymology ==
The phrase ignoratio elenchi is from Latin 'an ignoring of a refutation'. Here elenchi is the genitive singular of the Latin noun elenchus, which is from Ancient Greek ἔλεγχος (elenchos) 'an argument of disproof or refutation'. The translation in English of the Latin expression has varied somewhat. Hamblin proposed "misconception of refutation" or "ignorance of refutation" as a literal translation; John Arthur Oesterle preferred "ignoring the issue", while Irving Copi, Christopher Tindale and others used "irrelevant conclusion".

== See also ==
- Ad hominem
- Begging the question
- Chewbacca defense
- Enthymeme
- Evasion (ethics)
- Genetic fallacy
- List of fallacies
- Non sequitur (logic)
- Sophism
- Tone policing
