= Begging the question =

Logic founded on unproven premises

In classical rhetoric and logic, begging the question (Latin: petitio principii), or assuming the conclusion, is an informal fallacy that occurs when an argument's premises assume the truth of the conclusion. Historically, begging the question refers to a fault in a dialectical argument in which the speaker assumes some premise that has not been demonstrated to be true. In modern philosophical usage, it has come to refer to an argument in which the premises assume the conclusion without supporting it. This makes it an example of circular reasoning.

An example is:

- “Wool sweaters are better than nylon jackets as fall attire because wool sweaters have higher wool content".
  - The claim here is that wool sweaters are better than nylon jackets as fall attire. But the claim's justification begs the question, because it presupposes that wool is better than nylon. An essentialist analysis of this claim observes that anything made of wool intrinsically has more "wool content" than anything not made of wool, giving the claim weak explanatory power for wool's superiority to nylon.

In modern times, "beg the question" has taken on the common meaning of "raise the question", a usage distinct from the study of logic. This usage is criticized for diluting the original meaning of the phrase.

== History ==
Bust of Aristotle, whose Prior Analytics contained an early discussion of this fallacy

The original phrase used by Aristotle from which begging the question descends is τὸ ἐξ ἀρχῆς αἰτεῖν, to ex archēs aitein, or sometimes ἐν ἀρχῇ αἰτεῖν, en archē aitein, 'asking for the initial thing'. Aristotle's intended meaning is closely tied to the type of dialectical argument he discusses in his Topics, book VIII: a formalized debate in which the defending party asserts a thesis that the attacking party must attempt to refute by asking yes-or-no questions and deducing some inconsistency between the responses and the original thesis.

In this stylized form of debate, the proposition that the answerer undertakes to defend is called 'the initial thing' (τὸ ἐξ ἀρχῆς, to ex archēs, or τὸ ἐν ἀρχῇ, to en archē) and one of the rules of the debate is that the questioner cannot simply ask (beg) for it (that would be trivial and uninteresting). Aristotle discusses this in Sophistical Refutations and in Prior Analytics book II, (64b, 34–65a 9, for circular reasoning see 57b, 18–59b, 1).

The stylized dialectical exchanges Aristotle discusses in the Topics included rules for scoring the debate, and one important issue was precisely the matter of asking for the initial thing—which included not just making the actual thesis adopted by the answerer into a question, but also making a question out of a sentence that was too close to that thesis (for example, PA II 16).

The term was translated into English from Latin in the 16th century. The Latin version, petitio principii 'asking for the starting point', can be interpreted in different ways. Petitio (from peto), in the post-classical context in which the phrase arose, means 'assuming' or 'postulating', but in the older classical sense means 'petition', 'request' or 'beseeching'. Principii, genitive of principium, means 'beginning', 'basis' or 'premise' (of an argument). Literally petitio principii means 'assuming the premise' or 'assuming the original point'.

The Latin phrase comes from the Greek τὸ ἐν ἀρχῇ αἰτεῖσθαι (tò en archêi aiteîsthai 'asking the original point') in Aristotle's Prior Analytics II xvi 64b28–65a26:

Begging or assuming the point at issue consists (to take the expression in its widest sense) [in] failing to demonstrate the required proposition. But there are several other ways in which this may happen; for example, if the argument has not taken syllogistic form at all, he may argue from premises which are less known or equally unknown, or he may establish the antecedent utilizing its consequents; for demonstration proceeds from what is more certain and is prior. Now begging the question is none of these. [...] If, however, the relation of B to C is such that they are identical, or that they are clearly convertible, or that one applies to the other, then he is begging the point at issue. ... [B]egging the question is proving what is not self-evidently employing itself ... either because identical predicates belong to the same subject, or because the same predicate belongs to identical subjects.

— Aristotle, Hugh Tredennick (trans.) Prior Analytics

Aristotle's distinction between apodictic science and other forms of nondemonstrative knowledge rests on an epistemology and metaphysics wherein appropriate first principles become apparent to the trained dialectician:

Aristotle's advice in S.E. 27 for resolving fallacies of Begging the Question is brief. If one realizes that one is being asked to concede the original point, one should refuse to do so, even if the point being asked is a reputable belief. On the other hand, if one fails to realize that one has conceded the point at issue and the questioner uses the concession to produce the apparent refutation, then one should turn the tables on the sophistical opponent by oneself pointing out the fallacy committed. In dialectical exchange, it is a worse mistake to be caught asking for the original point than to have inadvertently granted such a request. The answerer in such a position has failed to detect when different utterances mean the same thing. The questioner, if he did not realize he was asking the original point, has committed the same error. But if he has knowingly asked for the original point, then he reveals himself to be ontologically confused: he has mistaken what is non-self-explanatory (known through other things) to be something self-explanatory (known through itself). In pointing this out to the false reasoner, one is not just pointing out a tactical psychological misjudgment by the questioner. It is not simply that the questioner falsely thought that the original point is placed under the guise of a semantic equivalent, or a logical equivalent, or a covering universal, or divided up into exhaustive parts, would be more persuasive to the answerer. Rather, the questioner falsely thought that a non-self-explanatory fact about the world was an explanatory first principle. For Aristotle, that certain facts are self-explanatory while others are not is not a reflection solely of the cognitive abilities of humans. It is primarily a reflection of the structure of noncognitive reality. In short, a successful resolution of such a fallacy requires a firm grasp of the correct explanatory powers of things. Without a knowledge of which things are self-explanatory and which are not the reasoner is liable to find a question-begging argument persuasive.

— Scott Gregory Schreiber, Aristotle on False Reasoning: Language and the World in the Sophistical Refutations

Thomas Fowler believed that petitio principii would be more properly called petitio quæsiti, which is literally 'begging the question'.

== Definition ==
To 'beg the question' (also called petitio principii) is to attempt to support a claim with a premise that itself restates or presupposes the claim. It is an attempt to prove a proposition while simultaneously taking the proposition for granted.

When the fallacy involves only a single variable, it is sometimes called a hysteron proteron (Greek for 'later earlier'), a rhetorical device, as in the statement:

Opium induces sleep because it has a soporific quality.

Reading this sentence, the only thing one can learn is a new word (soporific) that refers to a more common action (inducing sleep); it does not explain why opium causes that effect. A sentence that explains why opium often induces sleep (or the same, why opium has soporific quality) is

Opium often induces sleep because it contains morphine, an opioid which activates μ-opioid receptors in the central nervous system, a type of inhibitory receptor whose activation is often sufficient to induce sleep.

where the specific physiological processes are omitted for simplicity. A less obvious example from Fallacies and Pitfalls of Language: The Language Trap by S. Morris Engel:

Free trade will be good for this country. The reason is patently clear. Isn't it obvious that unrestricted commercial relations will bestow on all sections of this nation the benefits which result when there is an unimpeded flow of goods between countries?

This form of the fallacy may not be immediately obvious. Linguistic variations in syntax, sentence structure, and the literary device may conceal it, as may other factors involved in an argument's delivery. It may take the form of an unstated premise which is essential but not identical to the conclusion, or is "controversial or questionable for the same reasons that typically might lead someone to question the conclusion":

... [S]eldom is anyone going to simply place the conclusion word-for-word into the premises ... Rather, an arguer might use phraseology that conceals the fact that the conclusion is masquerading as a premise. The conclusion is rephrased to look different and is then placed in the premises.

— Paul Herrick

For example, one can obscure the fallacy by first making a statement in concrete terms, then attempting to pass off an identical statement, delivered in abstract terms, as evidence for the original. One could also "bring forth a proposition expressed in words of Saxon origin, and give as a reason for it the very same proposition stated in words of Norman origin", as here:

To allow every man an unbounded freedom of speech must always be, on the whole, advantageous to the State, for it is highly conducive to the interests of the community that each individual should enjoy a liberty perfectly unlimited of expressing his sentiments."

When the fallacy of begging the question is committed in more than one step, some authors dub it circulus in probando 'reasoning in a circle', or more commonly, circular reasoning.

Begging the question is usually not considered a formal fallacy (an argument that is defective because it uses an incorrect deductive step). Rather, it is usually a type of informal fallacy that is logically valid but unpersuasive, in that it fails to prove anything other than what is already assumed. There are some exceptions wherein it may be considered a formal fallacy, such as in non-reflexive logics.

== Related fallacies ==
Closely connected with begging the question is the fallacy of circular reasoning (circulus in probando), a fallacy in which the reasoner begins with the conclusion. The individual components of a circular argument can be logically valid because if the premises are true, the conclusion must be true, and does not lack relevance. However, circular reasoning is not persuasive because a listener who doubts the conclusion also doubts the premise that leads to it.

Begging the question is similar to the complex question (also known as trick question or fallacy of many questions): a question that, to be valid, requires the truth of another question that has not been established. For example, "Which color dress is Mary wearing?" may be fallacious because it presupposes that Mary is wearing a dress. Unless it has previously been established that her outfit is a dress, the question is fallacious because she could be wearing pants instead.

Another related fallacy is ignoratio elenchi or irrelevant conclusion: an argument that fails to address the issue in question, but appears to do so. An example might be a situation where A and B are debating whether the law permits A to do something. If A attempts to support his position with an argument that the law ought to allow him to do the thing in question, then he is guilty of ignoratio elenchi.

== Vernacular ==
In vernacular English, begging the question (or equivalent rephrasing thereof) is sometimes used in place of "raises the question", "invites the question", "suggests the question", "leaves unanswered the question" etc. Such preface is then followed with the question, as in:

- "[...] personal letter delivery is at an all-time low ... Which begs the question: are open letters the only kind the future will know?"
- "Hopewell's success begs the question: why aren't more companies doing the same?"
- "Spending the summer traveling around India is a great idea, but it does beg the question of how we can afford it."

Sometimes it is further confused with "dodging the question", an attempt to avoid it, or perhaps more often begging the question is simply used to mean leaving the question unanswered.

== See also ==
- Ambiguity – Type of uncertainty of meaning where several interpretations are possible
- Catch-22 (logic) – Situation in which one cannot avoid a problem because of contradictory constraints
- Circular definition – Self-referential description of meaning
- Consequentia mirabilis
- Euphemism treadmill – Mild or indirect word or expression
- Infinite regress § Failure to explain
- Fallacies of definition – Ways in which a term may be poorly defined
- Loaded question – Question containing an unjustified assumption
- Open-question argument – Philosophical argument
- Polysyllogism – Sequence of propositions which constitute a sequence of overlapping syllogisms
- Presuppositional apologetics – School of Christian apologetics
- Regress argument (diallelus)
- Spin (propaganda) – Form of propaganda in public relations and politics
