= Fallacy of composition =

Fallacy of inferring on the whole from a part

The fallacy of composition is an informal fallacy that arises when one infers that something is true of the whole from the fact that it is true of some part of the whole. A trivial example might be: "This tire is made of rubber; therefore, the vehicle of which it is a part is also made of rubber." That is fallacious, because vehicles are made with a variety of parts, most of which are not made of rubber. The fallacy of composition can apply even when a fact is true of every proper part of a greater entity, though. A more complicated example might be: "No atoms are alive. Therefore, nothing made of atoms is alive." This is a statement most people would consider incorrect, due to emergence, where the whole possesses properties not present in any of the parts.

The fallacy of composition is related to the fallacy of hasty generalization, in which an unwarranted inference is made from a statement about a sample to a statement about the population from which the sample is drawn. The fallacy of composition is the converse of the fallacy of division.

== Examples ==
=== Informal ===
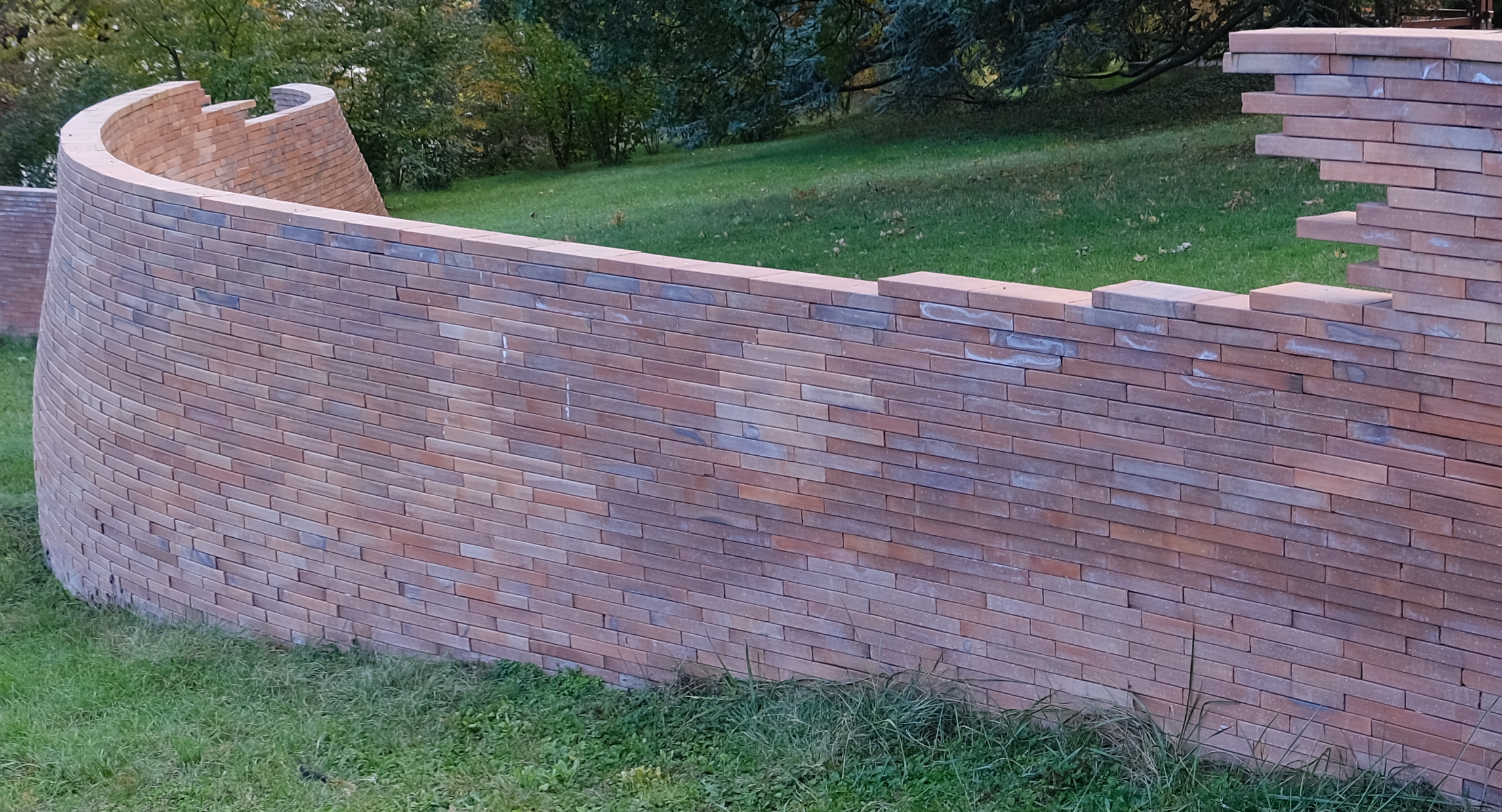
It is fallacious to think that a wall built from rectangular cuboid bricks would also be rectangular.

- "Every brick in the wall is rectangular cuboid–shaped. Therefore, the whole wall is rectangular cuboid–shaped."
- "If someone stands up from their seat at a cricket match, they can see better. Therefore, if everyone stands up, they can all see better."
- "If a runner runs faster, that runner can win the race. Therefore, if all the runners run faster, they can all win the race."

=== Politics ===
- In voting theory, the Condorcet paradox demonstrates a fallacy of composition: Even if all voters have rational preferences, the collective choice induced by majority rule is not transitive and hence not rational. The fallacy of composition occurs if from the rationality of the individuals one infers that society can be equally rational. The principle generalizes beyond the aggregation via majority rule to any reasonable aggregation rule, demonstrating that the aggregation of individual preferences into a social welfare function is fraught with severe difficulties (see Arrow's impossibility theorem and social choice theory).

=== Science ===
- Bertrand Russell's example in the Copleston–Russell debate: "Every man who exists has a mother... therefore the human race must have a mother". This was intended to illustrate how cosmological arguments for God's existence (specifically Frederick Copleston's) commit the fallacy by assuming that the universe itself requires a cause or an explanation for its existence just because everything in the universe does.
- "Since every part of a certain machine is light in weight, the machine as a whole is light in weight."
- In chemistry and materials science, a single type of atom may form allotropes with different physical properties from each other, and from their individual constituent atoms, such as diamond and graphite each consisting of carbon atoms. What is true of a single carbon atom is not true of a collection of carbon atoms bonded into a material. Furthermore, the properties of an atom differ from the properties of the individual subatomic particles that constitute it.
- In social network theory, a group of humans arranged into a social network can have abilities not possessed by the individual humans making up the network. A simple example is the bucket brigade, in which humans arranged into a chain can move buckets of water or other similar items across a distance faster and with less effort than can a disorganized group of individuals carrying the loads across the same distance. What is true of the part (an individual needing to move his or her body across the whole distance to move a load) is not true of the whole (in which individuals can move loads across the distance merely by standing in place and handing off the load to the next individual).

=== In economics ===
- "Some people can become millionaires with the right business concept. Therefore, if everyone has the right business concept, everyone will become a millionaire."
- The paradox of thrift is a notable fallacy of composition described by Keynesian economics.
- Division of labour is another economic example, in which overall productivity can greatly increase when individual workers specialize in doing different jobs. An individual worker may become more productive by specializing in making, say, hatpins, but by satisfying the wants of many other individuals for a given product, the specialist worker forces other workers to specialize in making different things. What is true for the part (earning more by investing in the skills or equipment to make a given product faster) is not true for the whole (because not everybody can profitably make the same product).
- In a tragedy of the commons, an individual can profit by consuming a larger share of a common, shared resource such as fish from the sea; but if too many individuals seek to consume more, they can destroy the resource.
- In the free rider problem, an individual can benefit by failing to pay when consuming a share of a public good; but if there are too many such "free riders", eventually there will be no "ride" for anyone.
- In the economics of education, Bryan Caplan explains credential inflation, or degree inflation, using the fallacy of composition: "If one person gets a college degree, that person looks more appealing in the labor market. If everyone gets a college degree, everyone will look more appealing in the labor market." (The Case Against Education)

== Modo hoc fallacy ==
The modo hoc (or "just this") fallacy is the informal error of assessing meaning to an existent based on the constituent properties of its material makeup while omitting the matter's arrangement. For instance, metaphysical naturalism states that while matter and motion are all that compose humans, it cannot be assumed that the characteristics inherent in the elements and physical reactions that make us up ultimately and solely define our meaning; for, a cow which is alive and well and a cow which has been chopped up into meat are the same matter but it is obvious that the arrangement of that matter clarifies those different situational meanings.

== See also ==
- Association fallacy
- Emergence – Unpredictable phenomenon in complex systems
- Interaction (statistics)
- Synecdoche, the figure of speech of two forms:
  - Pars pro toto using the word for a part by way of referring to the whole
  - Totum pro parte using the word for the whole by way of referring to a part
