= Informal fallacy =

Form of incorrect argument in natural language

Informal fallacies are a type of incorrect argument in natural language. The source of the error is not necessarily due to the form of the argument, as is the case for formal fallacies, but is due to its content and context. Fallacies, despite being incorrect, usually appear to be correct and thereby can seduce people into accepting and using them. These misleading appearances are often connected to various aspects of natural language, such as ambiguous or vague expressions, or the assumption of implicit premises instead of making them explicit.

Traditionally, a great number of informal fallacies have been identified, including the fallacy of equivocation, the fallacy of amphiboly, the fallacies of composition and division, the false dilemma, the fallacy of begging the question, the ad hominem fallacy and the appeal to ignorance. There is no general agreement as to how the various fallacies are to be grouped into categories. One approach sometimes found in the literature is to distinguish between fallacies of ambiguity, which have their root in ambiguous or vague language, fallacies of presumption, which involve false or unjustified premises, and fallacies of relevance, in which the premises are not relevant to the conclusion despite appearances otherwise.

Some approaches in contemporary philosophy consider additional factors besides content and context. As a result, some arguments traditionally viewed as informal fallacies are not considered fallacious from their perspective, or at least not in all cases. One such framework proposed is the dialogical approach, which conceives arguments as moves in a dialogue-game aimed at rationally persuading the other person. This game is governed by various rules. Fallacies are defined as violations of the dialogue rules impeding the progress of the dialogue. The epistemic approach constitutes another framework. Its core idea is that arguments play an epistemic role: they aim to expand our knowledge by providing a bridge from already justified beliefs to not yet justified beliefs. Fallacies are arguments that fall short of this goal by breaking a rule of epistemic justification. A particular form of the epistemic framework is the Bayesian approach, where the epistemic norms are given by the laws of probability, which our degrees of belief should track.

The study of fallacies aims at providing an account for evaluating and criticizing arguments. This involves both a descriptive account of what constitutes an argument and a normative account of which arguments are good or bad. In philosophy, fallacies are usually seen as a form of bad argument and are discussed as such in this article. Another conception, more common in non-scholarly discourse, sees fallacies not as arguments but rather as false yet popular beliefs.

== Traditional account ==
Informal fallacies are a form of incorrect argument in natural language. An argument is a series of propositions, called the premises, together with one more proposition, called the conclusion. The premises in correct arguments offer either deductive or defeasible support for the conclusion. The source of the error in incorrect arguments can be in the argument's form, content or context. If the error is only due to the form, it is considered a formal fallacy. Informal fallacies may also include formal errors but they primarily involve errors on the level of content and context. Informal fallacies are expressed in natural language. This brings with it various difficulties not faced when studying formal fallacies, like ambiguous terms, vague expressions or the premises being assumed implicitly rather than stated explicitly. Traditionally, a great number of informal fallacies have been listed, including the fallacy of equivocation, the fallacy of amphiboly, the fallacies of composition and division, the false dilemma, the fallacy of begging the question, the ad hominem fallacy or the appeal to ignorance. The traditional approach tries to account for these fallacies using the concepts and theses discussed in this section.

=== Arguments and fallacies ===
Only arguments can constitute a fallacy. Various erroneous expressions do not count as fallacies because no argument is made, e.g. because no reasons are cited or no assertion is made. The core idea of arguments is that the premises support the conclusion or that the conclusion follows from the premises. Deductively valid arguments offer the strongest form of support: for them, it is impossible for the conclusion to be false if all the premises are true. The premises in non-deductive arguments offer a certain degree of support for their conclusion but they are defeasible: it is possible for all the premises to be true and the conclusion to be false. Defeasible arguments may still be rationally compelling despite being fallible, so they do not automatically constitute fallacies. The premises of an argument may be seen as the foundation on which the conclusion is built. According to this analogy, two things can go wrong and turn an argument into a fallacy. It could be that the foundation is shaky. But even a solid foundation is not helpful if it does not provide support for the conclusion in question.

Traditionally, fallacies have been defined by three necessary conditions: "a fallacy (i) is an argument, (ii) that is invalid, and (iii) appears to be valid." This definition covers only formal fallacy since it has deductive invalidity as a necessary condition. But it can easily be modified to include informal fallacy by replacing this condition with a more general term, like logical weakness or incorrect reasoning. The last clause includes a psychological element in referring to how the argument appears to the arguer. This clause is used to distinguish genuine fallacies from mere mistakes in reasoning, for example, due to carelessness. The idea is that fallacies have an alluring element that goes beyond mere carelessness by seducing us into committing the mistake, thereby explaining why they are committed in the first place. Some philosophers reject this appeal to appearances because the reference to psychology would complicate the investigation in various ways. One issue is that appearances are different for different people. This problem also involves social studies in order to determine which reference group of people to consult for defining fallacies. It has been suggested that, at its core, the study of fallacies is about normative aspects of arguments and not about their persuasive force, which is studied by empirical psychology instead.

=== Form, content, and context ===
The source of the error in incorrect arguments can lie in the argument's form, content, or context. The form or structure of an argument is also called "rule of inference". The most well-known rule of inference is modus ponens, which states that given a premise of the form "If p then q" and another in the form "p", then the conclusion is "q". Rules of inferences are formal because it depends only on the structure or the syntax of the premises and not on their content. So an argument based on modus ponens is valid no matter what propositional contents are used for "p" and "q".

The content of an argument is found on the level of its propositions: it is what is expressed in them. The source of many informal fallacies is found in a false premise. For example, a false dilemma is a fallacy based on a false disjunctive claim that oversimplifies reality by excluding viable alternatives.

The context of an argument refers to the situation in which it is used. Based on its context it may be intended to play different roles. One way for an argument to be fallacious is if it fails to perform the role it was supposed to play. The strawman fallacy, for example, involves inaccurately attributing a weak position to one's opponent and then refuting this position. The argument itself may be valid in that the refutation of the opposed position really is successful. The error is found on the level of the context since the opponent does not hold this position. This dependence on a context means that the same argument may be successful in another context: against an opponent who actually holds the strawman position.

=== Natural language and contrast to formal fallacies ===
Formal fallacies are deductively invalid arguments. They are of special interest to the field of formal logic but they can only account for a small number of the known fallacies, for example, for affirming the consequent or denying the antecedent. Many other fallacies used in natural language, e.g. in advertising or in politics, involve informal fallacies. For example, false dilemmas or begging the question are fallacies despite being deductively valid. They are studied by informal logic. Part of the difficulty in analyzing informal fallacies is due to the fact that their structure is not always clearly expressed in natural language. Sometimes certain keywords like "because", "therefore", "since" or "consequently" indicate which parts of the expression constitute the premises and which part the conclusion. But other times this distinction remains implicit and it is not always obvious which parts should be identified as the premises and the conclusions. Many informal arguments include enthymematic premises: premises that are not explicitly stated but tacitly presumed. In some domestic quarrels and political debates, it is not clear from the outset what the two parties are arguing about and which theses they intend to defend. Sometimes the function of the debate is more to clarify these preliminary points than to advance actual arguments.

The distinction between formal and informal fallacies is opposed by deductivists, who hold that deductive invalidity is the reason for all fallacies. One way to explain that some fallacies do not seem to be deductively invalid is to hold that they contain various hidden assumptions, as is common for natural language arguments. The idea is that apparent informal fallacies can be turned into formal fallacies by making all these assumptions explicit and thereby revealing the deductive invalidity. The claim that this is possible for all fallacies is not generally accepted. One requirement for a formal treatment is translating the arguments in question into the language of formal logic, a process known as "formalization". Often many of the subtleties of natural language have to be ignored in this process. Some bodies of knowledge can be formalized without much residue but others resist formalization. This is also true for many informal fallacies.

== Contemporary approaches ==
The traditional approach to fallacies has received a lot of criticism in contemporary philosophy. This criticism is often based on the argument that some of the alleged fallacies are not fallacious at all, or at least not in all cases. It is argued that the traditional approach does not fully consider the aim of an argument in a particular context, and a framework is required in order to show that, given their perspective, it is possible to evaluate if an alleged fallacy is actually fallacious in a given case. It has been suggested that there may not be one single framework for evaluating all fallacies but only a manifold of ideals according to which a given argument may be good or bad.

Two prominent frameworks which have been proposed are the dialogical and epistemic approaches. The dialogical approach uses a game-theoretic framework to define arguments and sees fallacies as violations of the rules of the game. According to the epistemic approach, it is the goal of arguments to expand our knowledge by providing a bridge from already justified beliefs to not yet justified beliefs. Fallacies are arguments that fall short of this goal by breaking a rule of epistemic justification.

=== Dialogical ===
The dialogical approach sees arguments not simply as a series of premises together with a conclusion but as a speech act within a dialogue that aims to rationally persuade the other person of one's own position. A prominent version of this approach is defended by Douglas N. Walton. On his game-theoretic conception, a dialogue is a game between two players. At the outset, each player is committed to a set of propositions and has a conclusion they intend to prove. A player has won if they are able to persuade the opponent of their own conclusion. In this sense, dialogues can be characterized as "games of persuasion". The players can perform various moves that affect what they are committed to. In this framework, arguments are moves that take the opponent's commitments as premises and lead to the conclusion one is trying to prove. Since this is often not possible directly, various intermediary steps are taken, in which each argument takes a few steps towards one's intended conclusion by proposing an intermediary conclusion for the opponent to accept. This game is governed by various rules determining, among other things, which moves are allowed and when. The dialogical approach makes it possible to distinguish between positive arguments, which support one's own conclusion, and negative arguments, which deny the opponent's conclusion.

From this perspective, fallacies are defined as violations of the dialogue rules. They are "deceptively bad argument[s] that impede the progress of the dialogue". The strawman fallacy, for example, involves inaccurately attributing a weak position to one's opponent and then proving this position to lead to one's own conclusion. This mistake is not logical in the strict sense but dialogical: the conclusion may as well follow from these premises but the opponent does not hold these commitments. In some cases, it varies from game to game whether a certain move counts as a fallacy or not. For example, there are cases where the tu quoque "fallacy" is no fallacy at all. This argument, also known as appeal to hypocrisy, tries to discredit the opponent's argument by claiming that the opponent's behavior is inconsistent with the argument's conclusion. This move does not necessarily break the rules of the dialogue. Instead, it can reveal a weakness in the opponent's position by reflecting their criticism back onto them. This move shifts the burden of proof back to the opponent, thereby strengthening one's own position. But it still constitutes a fallacy if it is only used to evade an argument.

=== Epistemic ===
The core idea behind the epistemic approach is that arguments play an epistemic role: they aim to expand our knowledge by providing a bridge from already justified beliefs to not yet justified beliefs. Fallacies are arguments that fall short of this goal by breaking a rule of epistemic justification. This explains, for example, why arguments that are accidentally valid are still somehow flawed: because the arguer himself lacks a good reason to believe the conclusion.

The fallacy of begging the question, on this perspective, is a fallacy because it fails to expand our knowledge by providing independent justification for its conclusion. Instead, the conclusion is already assumed in one of its premises. A purely logical approach, on the other hand, fails to explain the fallacious nature of begging the question since the argument is deductively valid.

The Bayesian approach constitutes a special form of the epistemic approach. Bayesianism interprets degrees of belief as subjective probabilities, i.e. as the degree of certainty of the believer that the believed proposition is true. On this view, reasoning based on an argument can be interpreted as a process of changing one's degrees of belief, usually in response to new incoming information. Fallacies are probabilistically weak arguments, i.e. they have a low probability on the Bayesian model. Whether an argument constitutes a fallacy or not depends on the credences of the person evaluating the argument. This means that what constitutes a fallacy for one arguer may be a sound argument for another. This explains why, when trying to persuade someone, one should take the audience's beliefs into account. But it can also make sense of arguments independent of an audience, unlike the dialogical approach.

This perspective is well suited for explaining why some slippery slope arguments constitute fallacies but others not. Slippery slope arguments argue against a certain proposal based on the fact that this proposal would bring with it a causal chain of events eventually leading to a bad outcome. But even if every step in this chain is relatively probable, probabilistic calculus may still reveal that the likelihood of all steps occurring together is quite small. In this case, the argument would constitute a fallacy. But slippery slope arguments are rationally justified if the associated probabilities are sufficiently high.

== Types ==
A great variety of informal fallacies have been discussed in academic literature. There is controversy both concerning whether a given argument really constitutes a fallacy in all of its instances and concerning how the different fallacies should be grouped together into categories. The categorization here follows proposals commonly found in the academic literature in these or similar terms. It distinguishes between fallacies of ambiguity, which have their root in ambiguous or vague language, fallacies of presumption, which involve false or unjustified premises, and fallacies of relevance, in which the premises are not relevant to the conclusion despite appearances otherwise. Other categorizations have been proposed and some fallacies within this categorization could also be grouped in another category.

=== Fallacies of ambiguity ===
The source of the error for fallacies of ambiguity lies in the usage of language. This is due to the fact that many terms in natural language have ambiguous or vague meanings. Ambiguous terms have several meanings while vague terms have an unclear meaning. Fallacies of ambiguity often result in merely verbal disputes: the arguing parties have different topics in mind and thereby talk past each other without being aware of this. One way to avoid or solve these fallacies is to clarify language, e.g. by committing to definitions and by introducing new distinctions. Such reformulations may include a condensation of the original argument in order to make it easier to spot the erroneous step.

Fallacies of ambiguity are perhaps best exemplified by the fallacy of equivocation, in which the same term appears with two different meanings in the premises, for example:

Feathers are light. ("light" as "not heavy")
What is light cannot be dark. ("light" as "pale in color")
Therefore, feathers cannot be dark.

Equivocations are especially difficult to detect in cases where the two meanings are very closely related to each other.

The fallacy of amphiboly also involves ambiguity in meaning, but this ambiguity arises not on the level of individual terms but on the level of the sentence as a whole due to syntactic ambiguity, for example:

"The police were told to stop drinking on campus after midnight.
So, now they are able to respond to emergencies much better than before"

On one interpretation, the police are not allowed to drink alcohol. On another, it is now the job of the police to stop other people from drinking. The argument seems plausible on the former reading but fallacious on the latter reading.

The fallacies of division and composition are due to ambiguity of the term "all" and similar expressions. This term has both a collective and a distributive meaning. For example, the sentence "all the citizens are strong enough to resist a tyrant" may mean either that all together are strong enough (collective) or that each one individually is strong enough (distributive). The fallacy of division is committed if one infers from the sentence in the collective sense that one specific individual is strong enough. The fallacy of composition is committed if one infers from the fact that each member of a group has a property that the group as a whole has this property. For example, "[e]very member of the investigative team was an excellent researcher", therefore "[i]t was an excellent investigative team". Any form of fallaciously transferring a property from the whole to its parts or the other way round belongs to the category of fallacies of division and composition, even when linguistic ambiguity is not the cause.

=== Fallacies of presumption ===
Fallacies of presumption involve a false or unjustified premise but are often valid otherwise. This problematic premise can take different forms and the belief in it can be caused in different ways, corresponding to the various sub-categories in this field. These fallacies include the naturalistic fallacy, the moralistic fallacy and the intentional fallacy.

A false dilemma is a fallacy of presumption based on a false disjunctive claim that oversimplifies reality by excluding viable alternatives. For example, a false dilemma is committed when it is claimed that "Stacey spoke out against capitalism, therefore she must be a communist". One of the options excluded is that Stacey may be neither communist nor capitalist. Our liability to commit false dilemmas may be due to the tendency to simplify reality by ordering it through either-or-statements.

For fallacies of generalization, the false premise is due to an erroneous generalization. In the case of the fallacy of sweeping generalization, a general rule is applied incorrectly to an exceptional case. For example, "[e]veryone has a right to his or her property. Therefore, even though Jones had been declared insane, you had no right to take his weapon away." The generalization, in this case, ignores that insanity is an exceptional case to which the general rights of property do not unrestrictedly apply. Hasty generalization, on the other hand, involves the converse mistake of drawing a universal conclusion based on a small number of instances. For example, "I've met two people in Nicaragua so far, and they were both nice to me. So, all people I will meet in Nicaragua will be nice to me".

Begging the question is a form of circular reasoning in which the conclusion is already assumed in the premises. Because of this, the premises are unable to provide independent support for the conclusion. For example, the statement "Green is the best color because it is the greenest of all colors", offers no independent reason besides the initial assumption for its conclusion. Detecting this fallacy can be difficult when a complex argument with many sub-arguments is involved, resulting in a large circle.

=== Fallacies of relevance ===
Fallacies of relevance involve premises that are not relevant to the conclusion despite appearances otherwise. They may succeed in persuading the audience nonetheless due to being emotionally loaded (for example: by playing on prejudice, pity or fear).

Ad hominem arguments constitute an important class among the fallacies of relevance. In them, the arguer tries to attack a thesis by attacking the person pronouncing this thesis instead of attacking the thesis itself. Rejecting a theory in physics because its author is Jewish, which was common in the German physics community in the early 1930s, is an example of the ad hominem fallacy. But not all ad hominem arguments constitute fallacies. It is a common and reasonable practice in court, for example, to defend oneself against an accusation by casting doubt on the reliability of the witnesses. The difference between fallacious and justified ad hominem arguments depends on the relevancy of the character of the attacked person to the thesis in question. The author's cultural heritage seems to have very little relevance in most cases for theories in physics, but the reliability of a witness in court is highly relevant for whether one is justified in believing their testimony. Whataboutism is a special form of the ad hominem fallacy that attempts to discredit an opponent's position by charging them with hypocrisy without directly refuting or disproving their argument. It is particularly associated with contemporary Russian propaganda.

Appeal to ignorance is another fallacy due to irrelevance. It is based on the premise that there is no proof for a certain claim. From this premise, the conclusion is drawn that this claim must therefore be false. For example, "Nobody has ever proved to me there's a God, so I know there is no God". Another version of the appeal to ignorance concludes from the absence of proof against a claim that this claim must be true.

Arguments from analogy are also susceptible to fallacies of relevance. An analogy is a comparison between two objects based on similarity. Arguments from analogy involve inferences from information about a known object (the source) to the features of an unknown object (the target) based on the similarity between the two objects. Arguments from analogy have the following form: a is similar to b and a has feature F, therefore b probably also has feature F. The soundness of such arguments depends on the relevance of this similarity to the inferred feature. Without this relevance, the argument constitutes a faulty or false analogy, for example: "If a child gets a new toy he or she will want to play with it; So, if a nation gets new weapons, it will want to use them".

Etymological fallacies may confuse older or "original" meanings of words with current semantic usage.

== See also ==
- List of fallacies
- Fallacy
- Formal fallacy
