= Accident (fallacy) =

Informal fallacy

The fallacy of accident (also called destroying the exception or a dicto simpliciter ad dictum secundum quid) is an informal fallacy where a general rule is applied to an exceptional case. The fallacy of accident gets its name from the fact that one or more accidental features of the specific case make it an exception to the rule. A generalization that is largely true may not apply in a specific case (or to some subcategory of cases) for good reasons. It is one of the thirteen fallacies originally identified by Aristotle in Sophistical Refutations.

For example:

1. People who commit crimes are criminals.
2. Cutting people with knives is a crime.
3. Surgeons are people who cut other people with knives.
4. Therefore, surgeons are criminals.

The argument is committing the fallacy of accident because it erroneously generalizes a specific characteristic of cutting people with knives (which is a crime when done outside the context of certain professions or situations) to all instances of cutting people with knives.

== Examples ==
- Freedom of speech is a constitutionally guaranteed right. Therefore, John Q. Radical should not be arrested for his speech that incited the riot last week.
- People are obligated to keep their promises. When Jessica married Tyler, she promised to stay with him for life. Therefore, she should stay with him now, even though he has become an abusive spouse addicted to gambling and drugs.

== Reference list ==
- S. Morris Engel (1999). With Good Reason: An Introduction to Informal Fallacies. Bedford/St. Martin's. ISBN 0312157584.
