= Compassion =

Movement or motivation to help others

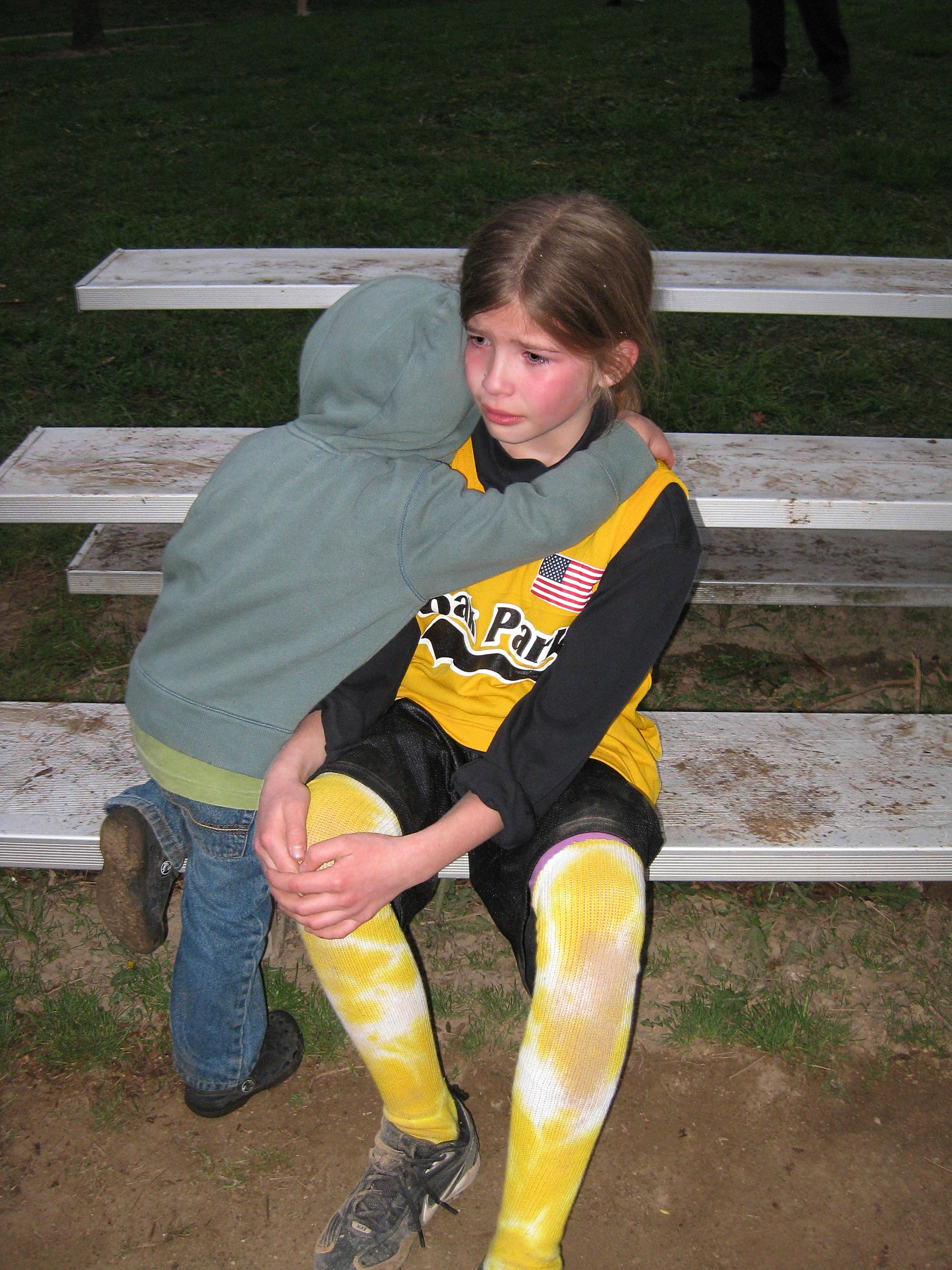
Hugging is a common display of compassion

Compassion is a social emotion that motivates people to go out of their way to relieve the physical, mental, or emotional pains of others and themselves. Compassion is recognizing, relating, and responding affirmatively to emotional aspects of the suffering of others.

Compassion involves "feeling for another" and is a precursor to empathy, the "feeling as another" capacity (as opposed to sympathy, the "feeling towards another"). In common parlance, active compassion is the desire to alleviate another's suffering. When based on notions such as fairness, justice, and interdependence, it may be considered partially rational in nature.

Compassion involves allowing oneself to be moved by suffering to help alleviate and prevent it. An act of compassion is one that is intended to be helpful. Other virtues that harmonize with compassion include patience, wisdom, kindness, perseverance, warmth, and resolve. It is often, though not inevitably, the key component in altruism. The difference between sympathy and compassion is that the former responds to others' suffering with sorrow and concern whereas the latter responds with warmth and care. An article in Clinical Psychology Review suggests that "compassion consists of three facets: noticing, feeling, and responding". Compassion is considered a key aspect in nearly everyone's day-to-day life, with many using it in religious teachings.

This article reviews compassion's etymology and theories of compassion and then reviews its core connections to psychology, neuroscience, medicine, and various religious and philosophical traditions.

== Etymology ==
The English noun compassion, meaning "to suffer together with", comes from Latin. Its prefix com- comes directly from com, an archaic version of the Latin preposition and affix cum (= with); the -passion segment is derived from passus, past participle of the deponent verb patior, patī, passus sum. Compassion is thus related in origin, form and meaning to the English noun patient (= one who suffers), from patiens, present participle of the same patior, and is akin to the Greek verb πάσχειν (paskhein, to suffer) and to its cognate noun πάθος (= pathos). Ranked a great virtue in numerous philosophies, compassion is considered in almost all the major religious traditions as among the greatest of virtues.

== Theories on conceptualizing compassion ==
Theoretical perspectives show contrasts in their approaches to compassion.

- Compassion is simply a variation of love or sadness, not a distinct emotion.
- From the perspective of evolutionary psychology, compassion can be viewed as a distinct emotional state, which can be differentiated from distress, sadness, and love.
- Compassion can be a synonym of empathic distress, which is characterized by the feeling of distress in connection with another person's suffering. This perspective of compassion is based on the finding that people sometimes emulate and feel the emotions of people around them. However, compassion does not need to be distressing and may consist of both personal distress (e.g., feelings of subjective distress at another's plight), or empathic concern or distress (e.g., feeling distress on behalf of another). While the first feels subjectively upsetting and stressful, the second often does not.
- According to Thupten Jinpa, compassion is a sense of concern that arises in us in the face of someone who is in need or someone who is in pain. It is accompanied by a kind of a wishing (i.e. desire) to see the relief or end of that situation, along with wanting (i.e. motivation) to do something about it. Compassion is, however, not pity, neither an attachment, nor the same as empathetic feeling, nor even just simply wishful thinking. Compassion is basically a variation of love. To further this variation of love, Skalski and Aanstoos, in their article The Phenomenology of Change Beyond Tolerating, describe compassion with the definition of alleviate in mind. In the definition for alleviate there is no mention of taking, stopping, or fixing someone's suffering. It is simply trying to make it less severe. This has a connotation of desperation of sorts. Desiring so little from such a dire situation can be described as inspiring feelings to help with another's suffering in any way.
- Emma Seppala distinguishes compassion from empathy and altruism as follows: "... The definition of compassion is often confused with that of empathy. Empathy, as defined by researchers, is the visceral or emotional experience of another person's feelings. It is, in a sense, an automatic mirroring of another's emotion, like tearing up at a friend's sadness. Altruism is an action that benefits someone else. It may or may not be accompanied by empathy or compassion, for example, in the case of making a donation for tax purposes. Although these terms are related to compassion, they are not identical. Compassion often involves an empathic response and altruistic behavior; however, compassion is defined as the emotional response when perceiving suffering which involves an authentic desire to help."

In addition, the more a person knows about the human condition and human experiences, the more vivid the route to identification with suffering becomes. Identifying with another person is an essential process for human beings, something that is even illustrated by infants who begin to mirror the facial expressions and body movements of their mother as early as the first days of their lives. Compassion is recognized through identifying with other people (i.e. perspective-taking), the knowledge of human behavior, the perception of suffering, the transfer of feelings, and the knowledge of goal and purpose-changes in sufferers which leads to the decline of their suffering.

Personality psychology agrees that human suffering is always individual and unique. Suffering can result from psychological, social, and physical trauma which happens in acute and chronic forms. Suffering has been defined as the perception of a person's impending destruction or loss of integrity, which continues until the threat is vanquished or the person's integrity can be restored.

Compassion therefore has a few major requirements: the compassionate person must feel that the troubles that evoke their feelings are serious; the belief that the sufferers' troubles are not self-inflicted; and the ability to picture oneself with the same problems in a non-blaming, non-shaming manner.

Because the compassion process is highly related to identifying with another person and is possible among people from other countries, cultures, locations, etc., compassion is characteristic of democratic societies.

The role of compassion as a factor contributing to individual or societal behavior has been the topic of continuous debate. In contrast to the process of identifying with other people, a complete absence of compassion may require ignoring or disapproving identification with other people or groups. Earlier studies established the links between interpersonal violence and cruelty which leads to indifference. Compassion may induce feelings of kindness and forgiveness, which could give people the ability to stop situations that have the potential to be distressing and occasionally lead to violence. This concept has been illustrated throughout history: The Holocaust, genocide, European colonization of the Americas, etc. The seemingly essential step in these atrocities could be the definition of the victims as "not human" or "not us". The atrocities committed throughout human history are thus claimed to have only been relieved, minimized, or overcome in their damaging effects through the presence of compassion, although recently, drawing on empirical research in evolutionary theory, developmental psychology, social neuroscience, and psychopathy, it has been counterargued that compassion or empathy and morality are neither systematically opposed to one another, nor inevitably complementary, since over the course of history, mankind has created social structures for upholding universal moral principles, such as Human Rights and the International Criminal Court.

On one hand, Thomas Nagel, for instance, critiques Joshua Greene by suggesting that he is too quick to conclude utilitarianism specifically from the general goal of constructing an impartial morality; for example, he says, Immanuel Kant and John Rawls offer other impartial approaches to ethical questions.

In his defense against the possible destructive nature of passions, Plato compared the human soul to a chariot: the intellect is the driver and the emotions are the horses, and life is a continual struggle to keep the emotions under control. In his defense of a solid universal morality, Immanuel Kant saw compassion as a weak and misguided sentiment. "Such benevolence is called soft-heartedness and should not occur at all among human beings", he said of it.

Pathological compassion can result in negative effects, such as impunity, miscarriage of justice, gullibility, compassion fatigue and depression, see also pathological altruism.

== Psychology ==
Compassion has become associated with and researched in the fields of positive psychology and social psychology. Compassion is a process of connecting by identifying with another person. This identification with others through compassion can lead to increased motivation to do something in an effort to relieve the suffering of others.

Compassion is an evolved function from the harmony of a three grid internal system: contentment-and-peace system, goals-and-drives system, and threat-and-safety system. Paul Gilbert defines these collectively as necessary regulated systems for compassion.

Paul Ekman describes a "taxonomy of compassion" including: emotional recognition (knowing how another person feels), emotional resonance (feeling emotions another person feels), familial connection (care-giver-offspring), global compassion (extending compassion to everyone in the world), sentient compassion (extended compassion to other species), and heroic compassion (compassion that comes with a risk).

Ekman also distinguishes proximal (i.e. in the moment) from distal compassion (i.e. predicting the future; affective forecasting): "...it has implications in terms of how we go about encouraging compassion. We are all familiar with proximal compassion: Someone falls down in the street, and we help him get up. That's proximal compassion: where we see someone in need, and we help them. But, when I used to tell my kids, 'Wear a helmet,' that's distal compassion: trying to prevent harm before it occurs. And that requires a different set of skills: It requires social forecasting, anticipating harm before it occurs, and trying to prevent it. Distal compassion is much more amenable to educational influences, I think, and it's our real hope." Distal compassion also requires perspective-taking.

Compassion is associated with psychological outcomes including increases in mindfulness and emotion regulation.

While empathy plays an important role in motivating caring for others and in guiding moral behavior, Jean Decety's research demonstrates that this is far from being systematic or irrespective to the social identity of the targets, interpersonal relationships, and social context. He proposes that empathic concern (compassion) has evolved to favor kin and members of one own social group, can bias social decision-making by valuing one single individual over a group of others, and this can frontally conflict with principles of fairness and justice.

=== Compassion fatigue ===
People with a higher capacity or responsibility to empathize with others may be at risk for "compassion fatigue", also called "secondary traumatic stress". Examples of people at risk for compassion fatigue are those who spend significant time responding to information related to suffering. However, newer research by Singer and Ricard suggests that it is lack of suitable distress tolerance that gets people fatigued from compassion activities. Individuals at risk for compassion fatigue usually display these four key attributes: diminished endurance and/or energy, declined empathic ability, helplessness and/or hopelessness, and emotional exhaustion. Negative coping skills can also increase the risk of developing compassion fatigue.

People can alleviate sorrow and distress by doing self-care activities on a regular basis. Improving consciousness helps to guide people to recognize the impact and circumstances of past events. After people learn the experience from the situation in the past, they are able to find the causes of compassion fatigue in their daily life. Practice of nonjudgmental compassion can prevent fatigue and burnout. Some methods that can help people to heal compassion fatigue include physical activity, eating healthy food with every meal, good relations with others, enjoying interacting with others in the community, writing a journal frequently, and sleeping enough every day. The practice of mindfulness and self-awareness also helps with compassion fatigue.

=== Conditions that influence compassion ===
Psychologist Paul Gilbert identifies several factors that can reduce a person's willingness to show compassion toward others. These include lower levels of perceived likability, competence, deservedness, and empathic capacity, as well as higher levels of self-focused competitiveness, anxiety and depression, feelings of being overwhelmed, and inhibiting influences within social structures and systems.

==== Compassion fade ====
Compassion fade is the tendency of people to experience a decrease in empathy as the number of people in need of aid increases. The term was coined by psychologist Paul Slovic. It is a type of cognitive bias that people use to justify their decision to help or not to help, and to ignore certain information. To turn compassion into compassionate behavior requires the singular person's response to the group in need, followed by motivation to help that can lead to action.

In an examination of the motivated regulation of compassion in the context of large-scale crises, such as natural disasters and genocides, research established that people tend to feel more compassion for single identifiable victims than single anonymous victims or large masses of victims (the Identifiable victim effect). People only show less compassion for many victims than for single victims of disasters when they expect to incur a financial cost upon helping. This collapse of compassion depends on having the motivation and ability to regulate emotions. People are more apt to offer help to a certain number of needy people if that number is closer to the whole number of people in need. Humans feel more compassionate towards members of another species the more recently their species had a common ancestor.

In laboratory research, psychologists are exploring how concerns about becoming emotionally exhausted may motivate people to curb their compassion for—and dehumanize—members of stigmatized social groups, such as homeless individuals and drug addicts.

== Neurobiology ==
Olga Klimecki (et al.), found differential (non-overlapping) fMRI brain activation areas in respect to compassion and empathy: compassion was associated with the mOFC, pregenual ACC, and ventral striatum. Empathy, in contrast, was associated with the anterior insula and the anterior midcingulate cortex (aMCC).

In one study conducted by James Rilling and Gregory Berns, neuroscientists at Emory University, subjects' brain activities were recorded while they helped someone in need. It was found that while the subjects were performing compassionate acts, the caudate nucleus and anterior cingulate regions of the brain were activated, the same areas of the brain associated with pleasure and reward. One brain region, the subgenual anterior cingulate cortex/basal forebrain, contributes to learning altruistic behavior, especially in those with trait empathy. The same study showed a connection between giving to charity and the promotion of social bonding and personal reputation. True compassion, if it exists at all, is thus inherently motivated (at least to some degree) by self-interest.

In a 2009 small fMRI experiment, researchers at the Brain and Creativity Institute studied strong feelings of compassion for social and physical pain in others. Both feelings involved an expected change in activity in the anterior insula, anterior cingulate, hypothalamus, and midbrain, but they also found a previously undescribed pattern of cortical activity on the posterior medial surface of each brain hemisphere, a region involved in the default mode of brain function, and implicated in self-related processes. Compassion for social pain in others was associated with strong activation in the interoceptive, inferior/posterior portion of this region, while compassion for physical pain in others involved heightened activity in the exteroceptive, superior/anterior portion. Compassion for social pain activated this superior/anterior section, to a lesser extent. Activity in the anterior insula related to compassion for social pain peaked later and endured longer than that associated with compassion for physical pain. Compassionate emotions toward others affect the prefrontal cortex, inferior frontal cortex, and the midbrain. Feelings and acts of compassion stimulate areas known to regulate homeostasis, such as the anterior insula, the anterior cingulate, the mesencephalon, the insular cortex and the hypothalamus, supporting the hypothesis that social emotions use some of the same basic devices involved in other, primary emotions.

== Compassion in practice ==
=== Medicine ===
Compassion is one of the most important attributes for physicians practicing medical services. Compassion brings about the desire to do something to help the sufferer. That desire to be helpful is not compassion, but it does suggest that compassion is similar to other emotions in that it motivates behaviors to reduce the tension brought on by the emotion. Physicians generally identify their central duties as the responsibility to put the patient's interests first, including the duty not to harm, to deliver proper care, and to maintain confidentiality. Compassion is seen in each of those duties because of its direct relation to the recognition and treatment of suffering. Physicians who use compassion understand the effects of sickness and suffering on human behavior. Compassion may be closely related to love and the emotions evoked in sickness and suffering. This is illustrated by the relationship between patients and physicians in medical institutions. The relationship between suffering patients and their caregivers provides evidence that compassion is a social emotion that is related to the closeness and cooperation between individuals.

=== Psychotherapy ===
Compassion-focused therapy, created by clinical psychologist Professor Paul Gilbert, focuses on the evolutionary psychology behind compassion: balancing of affect regulation systems (e.g. using affiliative emotions from the care-and-contentment system to soothe and reduce painful emotions from the threat-detection system).

== Self-compassion ==
Self-compassion is being kind to oneself and accepting suffering as a quality of being human. It has positive effects on subjective happiness, optimism, wisdom, curiosity, agreeableness, and extroversion. Kristin Neff and Christopher Germer identified three levels of activities that thwart self-compassion: self-criticism, self-isolation, and self-absorption; they equate this to fight, flight, and freeze responses. Parenting practices contribute to the development of self-compassion in children. Maternal support, secure attachment, and harmonious family functioning all create an environment where self-compassion can develop. On the other hand, certain developmental factors (i.e., personal fable) can hinder the development of self-compassion in children.

Authentic leadership centered on humanism and on nourishing quality interconnectedness increase compassion in the workplace to self and others.

Judith Jordan's concept of self-empathy is similar to self-compassion, it implies the capacity to notice, care, and respond towards one's own felt needs. Strategies of self-care involve valuing oneself, thinking about one's ideations of needs compassionately, and connecting with others in order to conversely experience renewal, support, and validation. Research indicates that self-compassionate individuals experience greater psychological health than those who lack self-compassion.

== Religion and philosophy ==
=== Abrahamic religions ===
==== Christianity ====
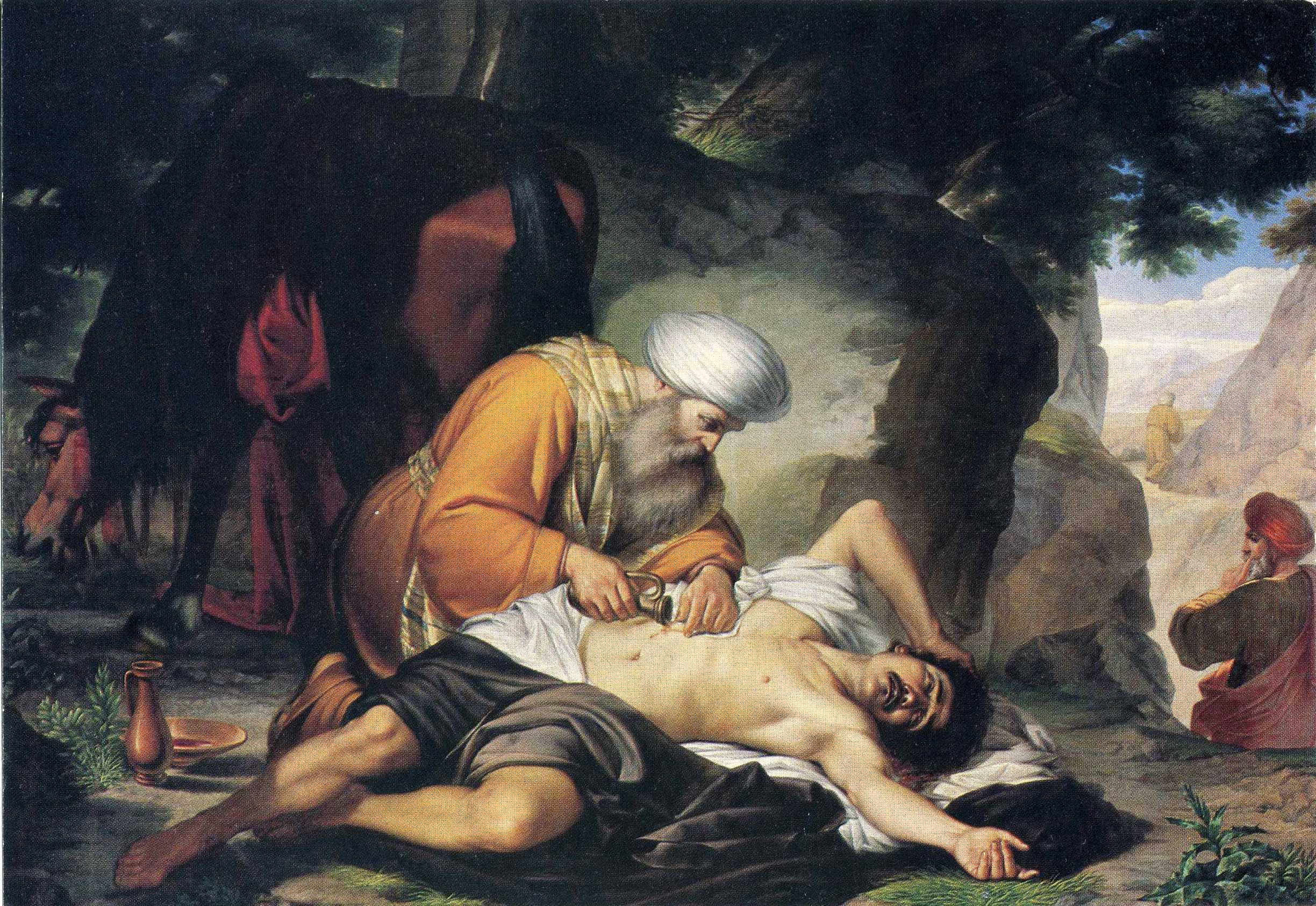
Compassion in action: painting of the parable of the Good Samaritan by Giacomo Conti (1813-1888)

The Christian Bible's Second Epistle to the Corinthians is but one place where God is spoken of as the "Father of mercies" (or "compassion") and the "God of all comfort."

Blessed be the God and Father of our Lord Jesus Christ, the Father of mercies and God of all comfort, who comforts us in all our affliction so that we will be able to comfort those who are in any affliction with the comfort with which we ourselves are comforted by God.

— 2 Corinthians 1:3–4

Jesus embodies the essence of compassion and relational care. Christ challenges Christians to forsake their own desires and to act compassionately towards others, particularly those in need or distress.

Carry each other's burdens, and in this way you will fulfill the law of Christ.

— Galatians 6:2

Be kind to one another, tender-hearted, forgiving each other, just as God in Christ also has forgiven you.

— Ephesians 4:32

One of his most well-known teachings about compassion is the Parable of the Good Samaritan (Luke 10:29–37), in which a Samaritan traveler "was moved with compassion" at the sight of a man who was beaten. Jesus also demonstrated compassion to those his society had condemned—tax collectors, prostitutes, and criminals—by saying "just because you received a loaf of bread, does not mean you were more conscientious about it, or more caring about your fellow man". Here, as in Luke 15 and other places, the word ευσπλαχνία is used for a visceral emotion. Wycliff gives "entrails of mercy" and the King James Version's "bowels of mercy" seems the inspiration for Charles Wesley's hymn "Bowels of divine compassion".

An interpretation of the incarnation and crucifixion of Jesus is that it was undertaken from a compassionate desire to feel the suffering of and effect the salvation of mankind; this was also a compassionate sacrifice by God of his own son ("For God so loved the world, that he gave his only begotten Son...").

A 2012 study of the historical Jesus claimed that he sought to elevate Judaic compassion as the supreme human virtue, capable of reducing suffering and fulfilling the God-ordained purpose of transforming the world into something more worthy of its creator.

==== Islam ====
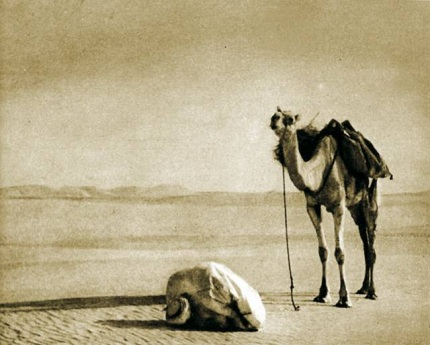
A 1930s photograph of a desert traveler praying to Allah "the Compassionate, the Merciful"

In the Muslim tradition, foremost among God's attributes are mercy and compassion, or, in the canonical language of Arabic, Rahman and Rahim. Each of the 114 chapters of the Quran, with one exception, begins with the verse, "In the name of Allah the Compassionate, the Merciful."

Certainly a Messenger has come to you from among yourselves; grievous to him is your falling into distress, excessively solicitous respecting you; to the believers (he is) compassionate.

— Quran 9:128

The Arabic word for compassion is rahmah. Its roots abound in the Quran. A good Muslim is to commence each day, each prayer, and each significant action by invoking Allah the Merciful and Compassionate, i.e., by reciting Bism-i-llah a-Rahman-i-Rahim. The womb and family ties are characterized by compassion and named after the exalted attribute of Allah "Al-Rahim" (The Compassionate).

==== Judaism ====
In the Jewish tradition, God is the Compassionate and is invoked as the Father of Compassion: hence Raḥmana or Compassionate becomes the usual designation for His revealed word. (Compare, above, the frequent use of raḥman in the Quran). Sorrow and pity for one in distress, creating a desire to relieve it, is a feeling ascribed alike to man and God: in Biblical Hebrew, (riḥam, from reḥem, the mother, womb), "to pity" or "to show mercy" in view of the sufferer's helplessness, hence also "to forgive" (Habakkuk 3:2), "to forbear" (Exodus 2:6; 1 Samuel 15:3; Jeremiah 15:15, 21:7). The Rabbis speak of the "thirteen attributes of compassion". The Bible identifies compassion of a mother for her offspring as comparable, though inferior, to a prophet's trust in God being validated upon appeal (Isaiah 49:15).

A classic articulation of the Golden Rule came from the first century Rabbi Hillel the Elder. Renowned in the Jewish tradition as a sage and a scholar, he is associated with the development of the Mishnah and the Talmud and, as such, is one of the most important figures in Jewish history. Asked for a summary of the Jewish religion "while standing on one leg" (meaning in the most concise terms) Hillel stated: "That which is hateful to you, do not do to your fellow. That is the whole Torah. The rest is the explanation; go and learn." Post 9/11, the words of Rabbi Hillel are frequently quoted in public lectures and interviews around the world by the prominent writer on comparative religion Karen Armstrong.

Many Jewish sources speak of the importance of compassion for and prohibitions on causing needless pain to animals. Significant rabbis who have done so include Rabbi Samson Raphael Hirsch, Rabbi Simhah Zissel Ziv, and Rabbi Moshe Cordovero.

=== Ancient Greek philosophy ===
In ancient Greek philosophy motivations based on pathos (feeling, passion) were typically distrusted. Reason was generally considered to be the proper guide to conduct. Compassion was considered pathos; hence, Justice is depicted as blindfolded, because her virtue is dispassion — not compassion.

Aristotle compared compassion with indignation and thought they were both worthy feelings: Compassion means being pained by another person's unearned misfortune; indignation means being pained by another's unearned good fortune. Both are an unhappy awareness of an unjust imbalance.

Stoicism had a doctrine of rational compassion known as oikeiôsis.

In Roman society, compassion was often seen as a vice when it was expressed as pity rather than mercy. In other words, showing empathy toward someone who was seen as deserving was considered virtuous, whereas showing empathy to someone deemed unworthy was considered immoral and weak.

=== Confucianism ===
Mencius maintained that everyone possesses the germ or root of compassion, illustrating his case with the famous example of the child at an open well:

"Suppose a man were, all of a sudden, to see a young child on the verge of falling into a well. He would certainly be moved to compassion, not because he wanted to get into the good graces of the parents, nor because he wished to win the praise of his fellow-villagers or friends, nor yet because he disliked the cry of the child".

Mencius saw the task of moral cultivation as that of developing the initial impulse of compassion into an enduring quality of benevolence.

=== Indian religions ===
==== Buddhism ====
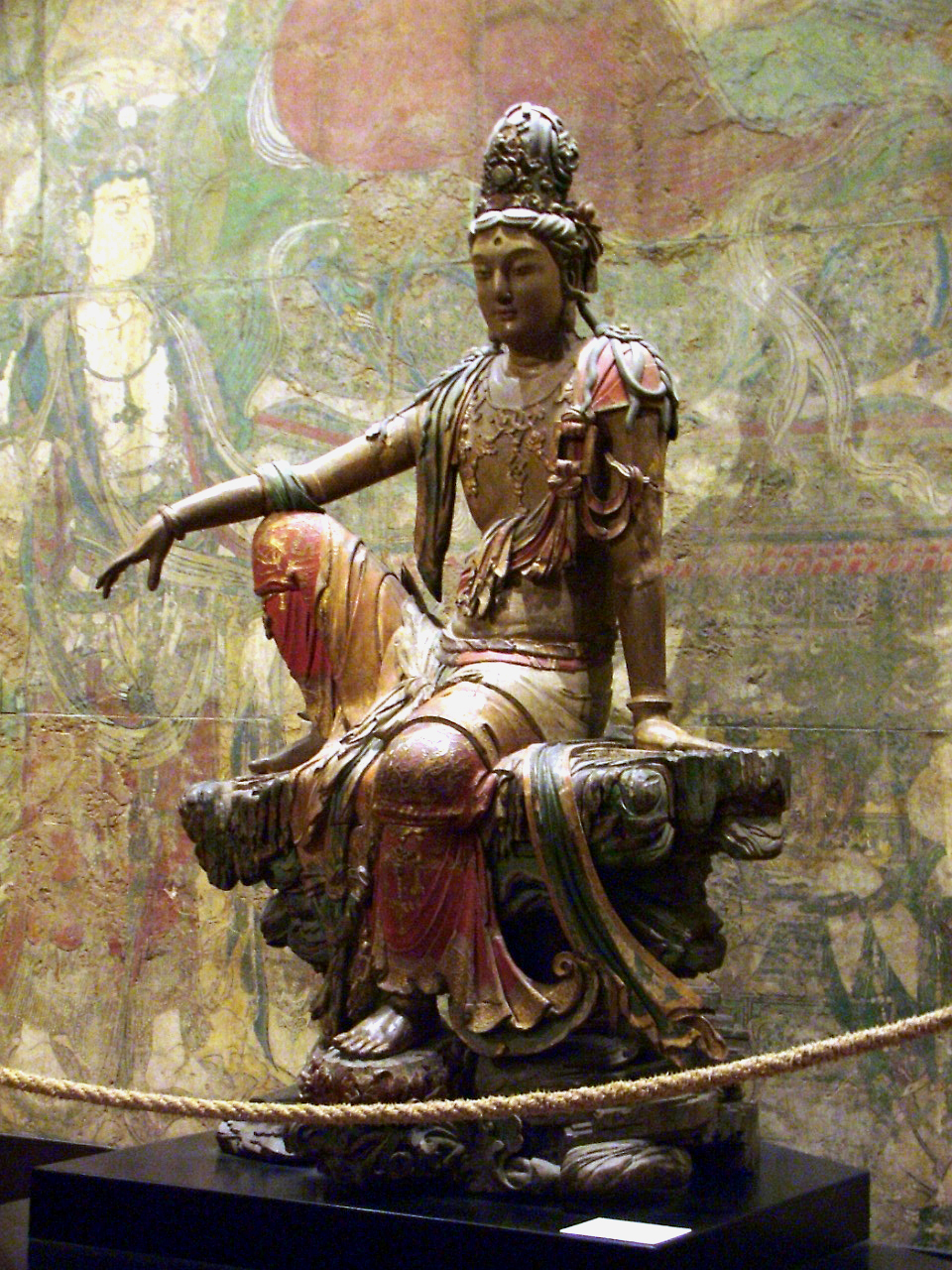
Avalokiteśvara looking out over the sea of suffering. China, Liao dynasty.

The first of the Four Noble Truths is the truth of suffering or dukkha (unsatisfactoriness or stress). Dukkha is one of the three distinguishing characteristics of all conditioned existence. It arises as a consequence of not understanding the nature of impermanence anicca (the second characteristic) as well as a lack of understanding that all phenomena are empty of self anatta (the third characteristic).

When one has an understanding of suffering and its origins and understands that liberation from suffering is possible, renunciation arises. Renunciation then lays the foundation for the development of compassion for others who also suffer. This is developed in stages:

Ordinary compassion
The compassion one has for those close to them such as friends and family and a wish to free them from the 'suffering of suffering'
Immeasurable compassion
This is the compassion that wishes to benefit all beings without exception. It is associated with both the Hinayana and Mahayana paths.

It is developed in four stages called The Four Immeasurables:
1. Loving kindness (Mettā)
2. Compassion (Karuṇā)
3. Joy (Mudita)
4. Equanimity (Upekṣā)
The American monk Bhikkhu Bodhi states that compassion "supplies the complement to loving-kindness: whereas loving-kindness has the characteristic of wishing for the happiness and welfare of others, compassion has the characteristic of wishing that others be free from suffering, a wish to be extended without limits to all living beings. Like metta, compassion arises by considering that all beings, like ourselves, wish to be free from suffering, yet despite their wishes continue to be harassed by pain, fear, sorrow, and other forms of dukkha."

Great Compassion
This is practiced exclusively in the Mahayana tradition and is associated with the development of Bodhicitta. The Bodhisattva Vow begins (in one version): "Suffering beings are numberless, I vow to liberate them all."

The 14th Dalai Lama has said, "If you want others to be happy, practice compassion. If you want to be happy, practice compassion." But he also warned that compassion is difficult to develop:

This is no easy task... there is no blessing or initiation — which, if only we could receive it — or any mysterious or magical formula or mantra or ritual — if only we could discover it — that can enable us to achieve transformation instantly. It comes little by little, just as a building is constructed brick by brick or, as the Tibetan expression has it, an ocean is formed drop by drop.... Nor should the reader suppose that what we are talking about here is the mere acquisition of knowledge. It is not even a question of developing the conviction that may come from such knowledge. What we are talking about is gaining an experience of virtue through constant practice and familiarization so that it becomes spontaneous. What we find is that the more we develop concern for others' well-being, the easier it becomes to act in others' interests. As we become habituated to the effort required, so the struggle to sustain it lessens. Eventually, it will become second nature. But there are no shortcuts.

==== Hinduism ====
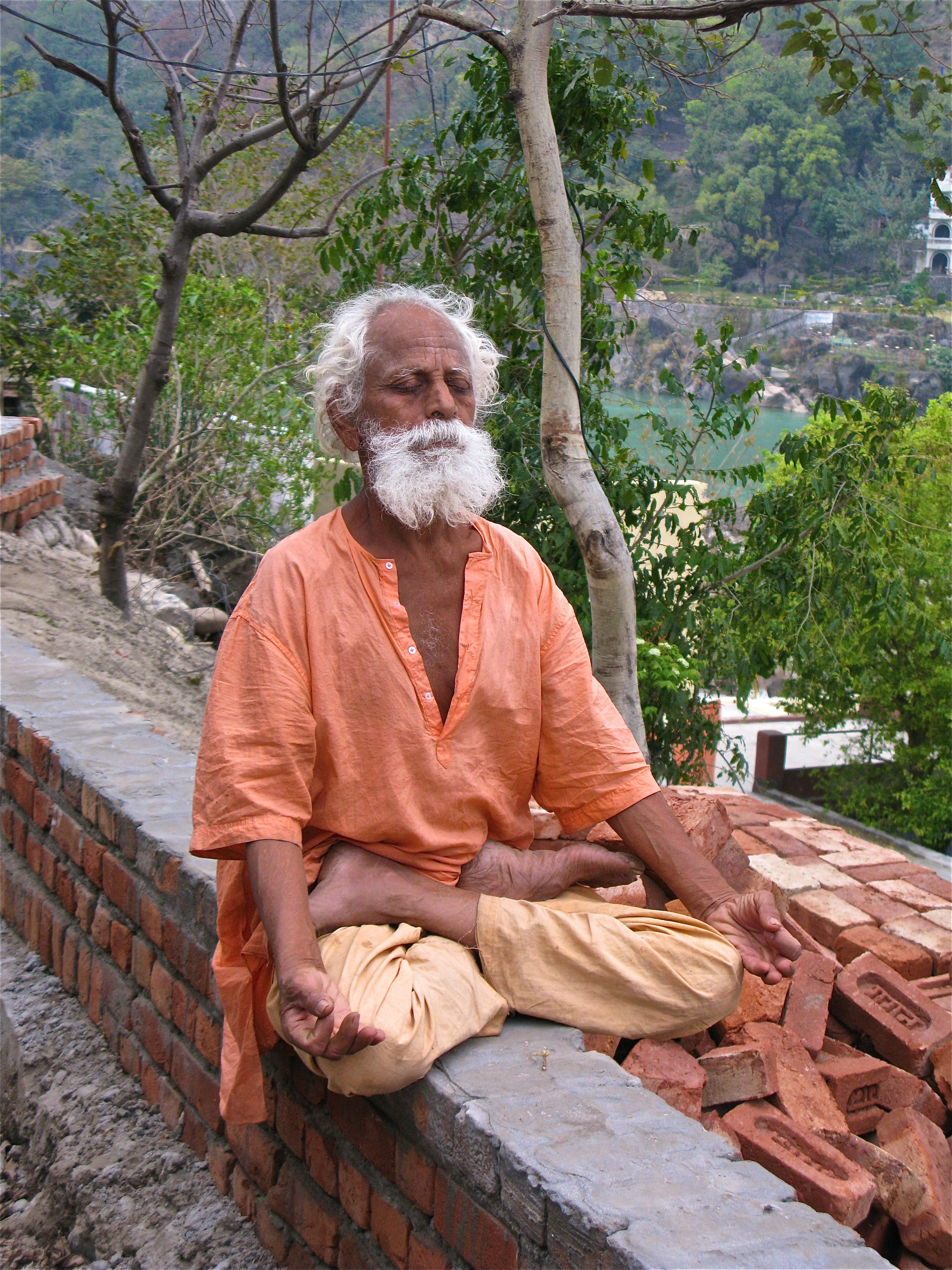
Yoga aims at physical, mental, and spiritual purification, with a compassionate mind and spirit being one of its most important goals. Various asanas and mudras are combined with meditation and self-reflection exercises to cultivate compassion.

In classical literature of Hinduism, compassion is a virtue with many shades, each shade explained by different terms. Three most common terms are daya (दया), karuṇā (करुणा), and anukampā (अनुकम्पा). Other words related to compassion in Hinduism include karunya, kripa, and anukrosha. Some of these words are used interchangeably among the schools of Hinduism to explain the concept of compassion, its sources, its consequences, and its nature. The virtue of compassion to all living beings, claims Gandhi and others, is a central concept in Hindu philosophy.

Daya is defined by Padma Purana as the virtuous desire to mitigate the sorrow and difficulties of others by putting forth whatever effort necessary. Matsya Purana describes daya as the value that treats all living beings (including human beings) as one's own self, wanting the welfare and good of the other living being. Such compassion, claims Matsya Purana, is one of necessary paths to being happy. Ekadashi Tattvam explains daya is treating a stranger, a relative, a friend, and a foe as one's own self; and argues that compassion is that state when one sees all living beings as part of one's own self, and when everyone's suffering is seen as one's own suffering. Compassion to all living beings, including to those who are strangers and those who are foes, is seen as a noble virtue.

Karuna, another word for compassion in Hindu philosophy, means placing one's mind in other's favor, thereby seeking to understand the best way to help alleviate their suffering through an act of karuna (compassion). Anukampa, yet another word for compassion, refers to one's state after one has observed and understood the pain and suffering in others.

In Mahabharata, Indra praises Yudhishthira for his anukrosha – compassion, sympathy – for all creatures. Tulsidas contrasts daya (compassion) with abhiman (arrogance, contempt of others), claiming compassion is a source of dharmic life, while arrogance a source of sin. Daya (compassion) is not kripa (pity) in Hinduism, or feeling sorry for the sufferer, because that is marred with condescension; compassion is recognizing one's own and another's suffering in order to actively alleviate that suffering. Compassion is the basis for ahimsa, a core virtue in Hindu philosophy and an article of everyday faith and practice. Ahimsa, or non-injury, is compassion-in-action that helps actively prevent suffering in all living things as well as helping beings overcome suffering and move closer to liberation.

Compassion in Hinduism is discussed as an absolute and a relative concept. There are two forms of compassion: one for those who suffer even though they have done nothing wrong and one for those who suffer because they did something wrong. Absolute compassion applies to both, while relative compassion addresses the difference between the former and the latter. An example of the latter include those who plead guilty or are convicted of a crime such as murder; in these cases, the virtue of compassion must be balanced with the virtue of justice.

The classical literature of Hinduism exists in many Indian languages. For example, Tirukkuṛaḷ, written between 200 BCE and 400 CE, and sometimes called the Tamil Veda, is a cherished classic on Hinduism written in a South Indian language. It dedicates Chapter 25 of Book 1 to compassion, further dedicating separate chapters each for the resulting values of compassion, chiefly, vegetarianism or veganism (Chapter 26), doing no harm (Chapter 32), non-killing (Chapter 33), possession of kindness (Chapter 8), dreading evil deeds (Chapter 21), benignity (Chapter 58), the right scepter (Chapter 55), and absence of terrorism (Chapter 57), to name a few.

==== Jainism ====
Compassion for all life is central to the Jain tradition. Though all life is considered sacred, human life is deemed the highest form of earthly existence. To kill any person, no matter their crime, is considered abhorrent. It is the only substantial religious tradition that requires both monks and laity to be vegetarian. It is suggested that certain strains of the Hindu tradition became vegetarian due to strong Jain influences. The Jain tradition's stance on nonviolence, however, goes far beyond vegetarianism. Jains refuse food obtained with unnecessary cruelty. Many practice veganism. The Lal Mandir, a prominent Jain temple in Delhi, is known for the Jain Birds Hospital in a second building behind the main temple.

== See also ==
- Agape – Ancient Greek word for love, Philia, Philautia, Storge, Eros: Greek terms for love
- Accountability – Concept of responsibility in ethics, governance and decision-making
- Blackstone's ratio – 1760s legal maxim by William Blackstone
- Brahmavihara – Four virtues In Buddhist ethic
- Charter for Compassion – 2009 call for world compassion
- Christian humanism – Type of humanism
- Compassion fatigue – Condition characterized by emotional and physical exhaustion
- Compassion fade – Empathy decrease as numbers in need increase
- Compassionate love – Love for the good of the other
- Charity (virtue) – One of the seven theological virtues
- Caregiving – Person helping another with activities of daily living
- Daya Mata – President of Self-Realization Fellowship from 1955 to 2010
- Empathic concern
- Ethics – Philosophical study of morality
- Fake compassion – Flattery, telling people what they want to hear
- Forgiveness – Renunciation or cessation of resentment, indignation, or anger
- Golden Rule – Principle of treating others reciprocally
- Greatness – Concept of superiority
- Humanism – Philosophical school of thought
- Karuna – Sanskrit term translated as empathy, compassion or mercy
- Kindness – Type of behaviour
- Moral emotions – Emotions concerning morality
- Moral psychology – Interdisciplinary field of study
- Perspective-taking – Act of analyzing from an alternative point of view
- Pity – Sympathetic sorrow evoked by the suffering of others
- Radical compassion – Israeli educator and philosophern
- Role-taking theory – Social-psychological concept
- Self-compassion – Extending compassion to one's self in instances of suffering or failure
- Shabad (hymn) – Sanskrit term referring to utterance in the sense of linguistic performance
- Social emotions – Emotions that depend upon other people
