= Compassion fade =

Empathy decrease as numbers in need increase

Compassion fade is the tendency to experience a decrease in empathy as the number of people in need of aid increase. As a type of cognitive bias, it has a significant effect on the prosocial behaviour from which helping behaviour generates. The term was developed by psychologist and researcher Paul Slovic.

This phenomenon can especially be observed through individuals' reluctance to help when faced with mass crises. Accordingly, directly linked to the idea of compassion fade is what Slovic, along with Deborah Small, refer to as the collapse of compassion (or compassion collapse), a psychological theory denoting the human tendency to turn away from mass suffering. Slovic also introduced the concept of psychophysical numbing—the diminished sensitivity to the value of life and an inability to appreciate loss—by taking a collectivist interpretation of the phenomenon of psychic numbing to discuss how people respond to mass atrocities.

The most common explanation for compassion fade is the use of a mental shortcut or heuristic called the 'affect heuristic', which causes people to make decisions based on emotional attachments to a stimulus. Other explanations for compassion fade include affective bias (empathy is greatest when one is able to visualise a victim) and motivated emotion regulation (when people suppress feelings to avoid being emotionally overwhelmed). Other cognitive biases that contribute to compassion fade include the identifiable victim effect (IVE), pseudo-inefficacy, and the prominence effect.

Compassion fade has also been used in reference to "the arithmetic of compassion."

== Overview ==
According to Paul Slovic,

A single child fallen down a well or dying of starvation stirs our hearts and moves our hands (and wallets) to action. Yet as soon as the number of victims increases to two, compassion—both affective and behavioral—begins to wane. Such compassion fade (i.e., decreases in helping behavior or support for it) has been widely documented in the humanitarian domain and is troubling for at least three reasons. First, it defies our normative beliefs about how we should value the lives of those in need. Second, it contradicts our intuitions about how we ourselves would react when asked to aid others. Third, it suggests that confronting large-scale humanitarian and (perhaps) environmental crises—from mass starvation to climate change—may not only involve overcoming political and economic hurdles but also insidious psychological ones as well.

=== Definition ===
Compassion fade, coined by psychologist Paul Slovic, is the tendency of people to experience a decrease in empathy as the number of people in need of aid increase. It is a type of cognitive bias that explains the tendency to ignore unwanted information when making a decision, so it is easier to justify.

The term compassion in this case refers to compassionate behaviour—that is, the intention to help or the act of helping. In this way, compassion fade can be explained by the cognitive processes that lead to helping behaviour. First is the individual's response to victim group, followed by motivation to help, which therefore generates the intention or act of helping. A conceptual model of helping highlights the self-concern and concern for others as mediators of motivation. Within the compassion fade theory, people tend to be influenced by:

- the anticipated positive effect (self-concern)
- concern for others (empathic concern)
- the perceived impact (hybrid of both interests)

=== Context ===
The concept of compassion fade was introduced in 1947 through a statement commonly attributed to Joseph Stalin (but originally coined by Kurt Tucholsky in 1925) "the death of one man is a tragedy, the death of millions is a statistic."

Traditional economic and psychological theory of choice is based on the assumption that preferences are determined by the objective valuation of an item. Research in the 1960s and 1970s by psychologists Paul Slovic and Sarah Litchfield first looked at the emotional mechanisms in risk-assessment and developed the theory of preference construction, people tend to unequally weigh possible alternatives when making a decision.

The term psychic numbing was coined in 1997 to describe the non-linear relationship between provision of aid and the number of lives at risk. It explains how valuation of lives are cognitively perceived: each life decreases in marginal value as the number of victims increase. In the early 2000s, research by behavioural economist Daniel Kahneman found that people have different emotional and cognitive reactions to numerical information. Similar research by Slovic in 2007 demonstrated people's emotional responses decreased as the number of lives increase which led to the development of Compassion fade.

=== Compassion fade and mass crises ===
Compassion fade may especially be observed through individuals' reluctance to help when faced with mass crises, as a response to the number of victims involved in an event is determined by the balancing of self-interest and the concern for others. According to the concept of confirmation bias, people tend to consider self-interest alongside concern for others. An apathetic response following a large number of victims is considered to be normal because people have a limited capacity to feel sympathy; hence, conversely, an emotional response results in the individual's willingness and ability to help.

Accordingly, directly linked to the idea of compassion fade is what Slovic, along with Deborah Small, refer to as the collapse of compassion (or compassion collapse), a psychological theory denoting the human tendency to turn away from mass suffering.

One paper, written by Slovic and Daniel Västfjäll, sets out a simple formula for the collapse:

[W]here the emotion or affective feeling is greatest at N = 1 but begins to fade at N = 2 and collapses at some higher value of N that becomes simply 'a statistic.'

Also linked to compassion fade and the collapse of compassion is the phenomenon of psychic numbing, the tendency for individuals or societies to withdraw attention from past traumatic experiences or future threats. Accounting for how people respond to mass atrocities, Slovic adapted the concept of psychic numbing and introduced the idea of psychophysical numbing, the diminished sensitivity to the value of life and an inability to appreciate loss. In other words, according to Slovic, the "more who die, the less we care."

Researchers proposed that in the human mind, large groups are almost staggering and therefore they rather participate in regulating their emotions to limit their overwhelming levels of emotions due to their experiences. This is because individuals tend to draw out no emotion regulation compared to that of the groups.

== Measurements ==
=== Valuation as a function of victim numbers ===
Compassion fade contradicts the traditional model for valuing life that assumes all lives should be valued equally. Empirical data on charitable giving found that donations are not linearly related to the number of victims but rather decrease as the number of victims increase. This concept termed psychophysical or psychic numbing. A psychophysical numbing function depicts the number of lives at risk as a function of the value of life saving. In accordance to the theory of compassion fade, the function illustrates a decreasing marginal increase as the number of lives at risk increase. For example, when one life is at risk, the value is $100; when ten lives are at risk, the value decreases to $80; and when fifty lives are at risk, the value decreases to $50. Compassion fade explains this as people's perception that, as the number of lives in need of aid increases, individuality decreases and thus the value of the life decreases.

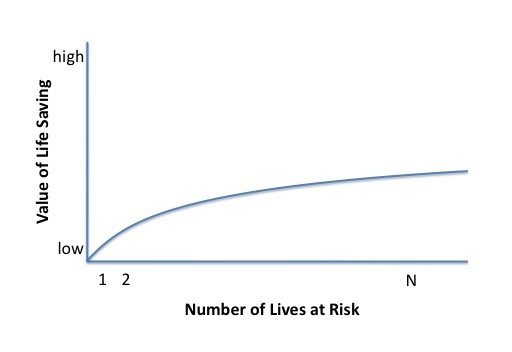
Association between the number of lives at risk and the value of saving a life

Effects of compassion fade on the valuation of victim numbers is seen through the singularity effect. Research showed as more information about the group size is provided, it more negatively affects the valuation of lives.

Other studies that investigated compassion fade with smaller victim numbers were not effective when using this prototype because it is not difficult to picture comprehensive images of victims with smaller number increases.

=== Valuation as a function of human lives ===
Compassion fade can be conceptually measured with the number of lives as a function of emotional response. The traditional model for valuing human lives would assume emotional reactions and the number of lives are positively correlated. However, research found people do not have the same cognitive and emotional response to the number of victims in need. The increasing marginal decrease in emotional response to the number of lives at risk is the foundation for the theory of compassion fade.

Research by Paul Slovic found the loss of a single identifiable appears elicits a greater emotional response where as people grow apathetic as the number of lives at risk increase because it is too emotionally distressing to comprehend. Similar research suggests that compassion fade occurs as soon as the number of victims increases from one.

The negative relationship between emotional response and valuation of human lives explains why life is not valued equally. It conceptually explains why compassion fade fails to initiate emotional processes that lead to helping behaviour. Effects of this relationship can be seen through The Singularity Effect and Pseudo-inefficacy.

== Causes ==
The most common explanation for compassion fade is the use of a mental shortcut called the 'affect heuristic', which causes people to make decisions based on emotional attachments to a stimulus.

While in the past there has been a view that humans make decisions in line with the expected utility hypothesis, current theories suggest that people make decisions via two different thinking mechanisms outlined in the dual process theory. Accordingly, compassion fade is an irrational phenomenon that is carried out through system-1 thinking mechanisms. System 1 is characterised by fast, automatic, effortless, associative thinking patterns and is often driven by emotions; in contrast, system 2 is a more effortful, slower process whereby initial thoughts are challenged against other known knowledge, leading to rational and considered decisions. It is this emotional element of system 1 that leads people to see the effects of compassion fade, as humans make decisions based upon the affect and feelings of emotion over the facts of the situation.

Other explanations for compassion fade include: affective bias (empathy is greatest when one is able to visualise a victim) and motivated emotion regulation (when people suppress feelings to avoid being emotionally overwhelmed).

The collapse of compassion happens because people actively, perhaps subconsciously, regulate their emotions to withhold the compassion they feel for the groups of people who suffer.

=== Mental imagery and attention ===
Compassion is experienced greatest when an individual is able to pay more attention to and more vividly picture a victim. Psychological research into choice theory found that vivid mental stimuli plays a large part in processing information. Given the human ability to feel compassion is limited, more vivid mental images are closely related to greater empathy. Single, individual victims tend to be easier to mentally depict in greater detail. A large number of victims is more difficult to picture so it becomes more depersonalised causing the individual to feel apathetic and empathy to stretch thin.

Studies on cognitive biases categorise this tendency as a "heuristic" to explain that people make decisions based on how easily the information is to process. It is easier to process information about a single target (i.e. one victim) versus an abstract target (i.e. multiple victims) that in effect loses the emotional meaning attached to it.

Similar studies have demonstrated when an individual is presented with a number of single victims in a group they tend to experience less empathetic concern towards any member. To recognise each victim individually a person must focus specifically on individual features. If the individual is unable to develop a cohesive image of these features, these images will not generate compassionate behaviour.

=== Information processing ===
Compassion fade can be considered an attempt to moderate one's emotions when faced with mass crises. Research supports that individuals tune out to feelings to avoid becoming emotionally overwhelmed or distressed. An experiment conducted by Vastfjall and Slovic in 2014 found people who did not regulate emotions experienced a decreased effect of compassion fade.

Similar research on charitable showed that individuals that were able to more effectively process information experienced stronger emotional responses which led to higher donations.

Compassion fade can be caused by exposure to a seemingly incessant stream of fundraisers or beggars ("it's never enough"), as well as the knowledge that some of them are in fact fraudsters and the money donated is likely to be misappropriated.

=== Individual differences ===
Compassion fade is greatly influenced by individual factors responsible in the cognitive mechanisms that affect emotional responses. Compassion fade was believed to be correlated with intelligence; however, studies have shown numerical literacy and ability to think rationally is more influential on the individual's empathetic concern. Compassion fade concerns an individual's ability to understand statistics in order to develop a mental image and attach meaning to the data leading to a stronger response. Studies that tested charitable giving showed only lower numerate individuals with more abstract images gave lower donations due to a lack of response. Similar research concluded that people with greater ability to think rationally should experience a more linear relationship between number of victims and valuations.

=== Situational differences ===
==== Bystander effect ====
Compassion fade is affected by situational factors such as the number of people available to help that in turn affects the emotional processes responsible for a person's motivation to help. The bystander effect is the concept that people are less willing to help in the presence of other people than when they are alone. Research in the late 1960s by Darley and Latane found only 62% of people were motivated to offer help when in a group greater than five people. Similar research in relation to helping behaviour found diffusion of responsibility played a large role in decreasing an individual's motivation to help. The effects of the bystander effect on compassion fade is heightened where the number of people in need of aid increases, the perceived burden of responsibility on an individual decrease.

== Associated effects and outcomes ==
Other cognitive biases that contribute to compassion fade include the identifiable victim effect, pseudo-inefficacy, and the prominence effect. These effects show how compassion fade is an irrational thought process driven by how much emotion one feels for a certain cause. By understanding these effects, they can be used by charities to help maximise donations by understanding the thought process behind why people donate.

=== Identifiable Victim Effect (IVE) ===
Identifiable Victim Effect (aka, the singularity effect) refers to the concept that people are more willing to help a single, identifiable victim than multiple, non-identified ones.

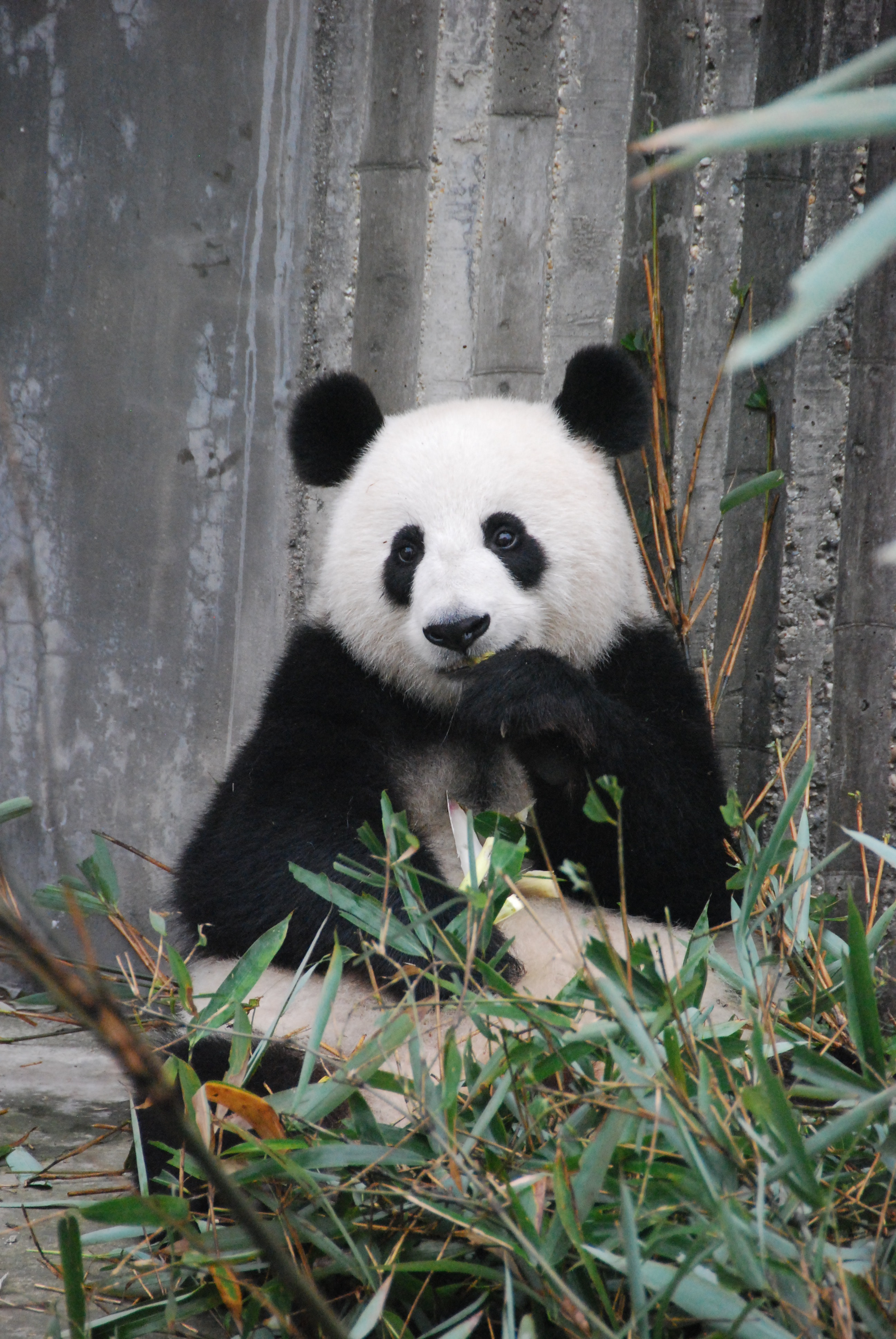
One may be likely to help an individual panda but neglect to assist a large group of pandas.

The singularity effect has been found to work even in the circumstance of an individual victim contrasted against a pair of victims. When a charity presents two victims over a singular victim results show that a significantly larger amount of donations are made towards the singular victim. Less effect was also found to be felt for the paired victims. This finding provides evidence of how compassion fade is caused by an emotional reaction to a stimulus, as when people feel less affect, they are less likely to donate or provide help towards a cause. The researchers also measured the level to which participants believed their donation would make a difference to the children's lives. Comparisons between the singular child condition and the paired children condition show there was not a significant difference in perceived probability that the donation will improve their lives. This shows how perceived utility is not causing this effect of compassion fade. Instead of making rational judgments in line with the expected utility theory the singularity effect shows how compassion fade is the result of making decisions via the affect heuristic.

There have also been other proposed reasonings for the singularity effect. It has been proposed that the singularity effect occurs due to prospect theory. This reasoning states that the singularity effect occurs because two is not perceived by the brain to have twice the utility of one so there is a diminishing sense of utility as the sample size increases. Additionally, other explanations state that the singularity effect only occurs when people have no prior knowledge of the situation they are making a decision on. In a study which looked at donations to help pandas, environmentalists evenly donated to both the single panda in need and a group of 8 pandas, whereas non-environmentalists donated a significantly larger amount to the single panda. This shows how when participants are led to decide as an emotional response, as the non-environmentalist did, compared to those who already had substantial knowledge there is more evidence of compassion fade. This effect of compassion fade does not engage system two and only occurs when we are reliant on system 1.

=== Other effects ===
Pseudo-inefficacy means people are less willing to provide aid to one person once they become aware of the larger scope of people whom they are unable to help. This comes as result of people's willingness to help being motivated by the perceived efficacy of their contribution. Pseudo-inefficacy is influenced by self-efficacy (i.e. perceived ability to help) and response efficacy (i.e. the expected effect of help). Evidence shows increasing self-efficacy increases perceived response efficacy thus increasing charitable behaviour.

The prominence effect is a situation where an individual favour the option that is superior based upon the most important attribute. In circumstances where more socially desired attributes are given priority, the decision is more easily accepted and justified.

The proportion dominance effect explains how people are not motivated to save the maximum number of lives but are motivated to help causes which have the highest proportion of lives saved.

== Real-world effects and experiments ==
In the early 2000s, research by behavioural economist Daniel Kahneman found that people have different emotional and cognitive reactions to numerical information. Similar research by Slovic in 2007 demonstrated people's emotional responses decreased as the number of lives increase which led to the development of Compassion fade.

Some economic theorists have argued that, because emotions and helping behaviour should track the number of people in need of help, people should respond more strongly when more people are suffering, whatever the context. Yet, when psychologists measure actual emotion and helping behaviour, this is not the observed result. Rather, people tend to experience strong emotion in response to one individual in need of aid, and this translates into a strong desire to help; but when there are many individuals, people actually feel less emotion and act less charitably.

=== News media ===
How the news events are presented affects viewers frame events.

According to Mark Hay, the massacre carried out by Boko Haram from 3–7 January 2015 received almost no immediate media attention; however, on January 7, when 12 satirists from Charlie Hebdo magazine were killed in Paris, "the media erupted (and continues to erupt) with heartfelt outrage and constant coverage." Journalists like Simon Allison of the Daily Maverick have argued that, while biased media coverage is a sign that the media and the world do not mourn deaths in Africa the way they do in the West, such bias also points towards a more understated failure in people's natural human ability to gather any empathy as the number of victims rise following a mass killing or to see past the fact that numbers of people are not people, but that they are numbers.

In her book, European Foreign Conflict Reporting: A Comparative Analysis of Public News, Emma Heywood outlined the ways in which mass tragedies are presented, which can determine the amount of compassionate responses elicited.

Techniques, which could raise compassion amongst the viewers, and which prevail on New at Ten, are disregarded, allowing the victims to remain unfamiliar and dissociated from the viewer. This approach does not encourage viewers to engage with the sufferers, rather releases them from any responsibility to participate emotionally. Instead compassion values are sidelined and potential opportunities to dwell on victim coverage are replaced by images of fighting and violence.

=== Provision of aid ===
Compassion fade is illustrated by the reluctance to respond to crises in a global scale affecting large numbers of people. Evidence shows that compassionate behaviour (i.e. financial donations, acts of service) diminish as the number of those in need increases.

Research on charitable donations indicates donations are negatively related to the number of people in need. For example, in 2014 the Ebola outbreak saw the loss of over 3400 lives and donations to the American Red Cross was $100,000 over a six-month period. However, in 2015 a crowdfunding campaign for a child in New York to visit Harvard raised over $1.2 million in a one-month period.

=== Environmental crises ===
Compassion fade research is extended to the environmental domain where the lack of response to environmental challenges, such as climate change, pose a threat to millions of unidentified victims.

However, studies have shown the effects of compassion fade may differ with non-human animals:

- An experiment by Hsee and Rottenstreich (2004) tested the identifiable victim effect as an outcome of compassion fade. The researchers found the donations to help a single versus a group of four pandas was not significantly different.
- A study by Hart (2011) found that people information about the detrimental effects of climate change on polar bears elicited a stronger response when presented with a large number of polar bears rather than a single identifiable one.
- Ritov and Kogut (2011) have demonstrated identifiable victim effects only occurred when helping out-group members. Researchers concluded that these findings suggest the extent of environmental compassion fade is more subject to individual differences and perceptions of non-human lives.

=== Other experiments ===
==== Cameron and Payne (2011) ====
A 2011 experiment by C. Daryl Cameron and B. Keith Payne tested whether removing a source of motivation to regulate emotion would reduce the collapse of compassion.

Other researchers who also did studies included measures of three alternative explanations for the collapse of compassion: psychological distance, diffusion of responsibility, and success in helping the victims. People might experience less emotion toward multiple victims because they feel a greater psychological distance from these victims; because they feel less responsible for helping; or because they feel that their helping will not matter much. If these alternatives were to be eliminated however, these explanations would more support the financial cost as a critical factor in the collapse of compassion.

The nine items measuring compassion were averaged together. A two-way between-subjects analysis of variance (ANOVA) was conducted to examine the effects of help request and number of victims on compassion. While there were no significant main effects of either of the two, there was a significant interaction between them. The pattern of means for the interaction between compassion, help request, and number of victims was displayed; this interaction suggests that the difference in compassion toward 1 versus 8 victims depended upon whether participants expected to be asked to help those victims. Cameron and Payne probed the interaction by first examining the effect of the help request separately in the 1-victim and 8-victim groups. In the 1-victim condition, there was no significant effect of help request on compassion. In the 8-victim condition, by contrast, participants reported significantly greater compassion when they would not be asked to help than when they would be asked to help.

Cameron and Payne also examined the effect of number of victims separately in the help-request and no-help-request conditions. When help was requested, participants reported numerically greater compassion toward a single victim than toward eight, although this simple effect was not significant. In contrast, when help was not requested, eight victims elicited significantly more compassion than one victim. By removing the expectation that participants would be asked to donate money, they were able to reverse the typical collapse of compassion pattern.

==== Tam (2016) ====
In 2016, Northeastern University honours student Ka Ho Tam hired 242 undergrad students to participate in his study, where they would read stories of people from different parts of the world who shared their experiences (e.g. having a family gathering) or specific to a particular culture (e.g. celebrating an Ethiopian festival).

Thereafter participants of 1 to 8 poverty-stricken Ethiopian children, along with a description of how people from that part of Ethiopia are suffering. Lastly, these participants did questionnaires to measure similarity with and compassion toward the Ethiopian children. Tam found that the reading of the shared experiences drew out compassion toward a single victim and not multiple victims. This can be further explained by saying that people actively suppress compassion when they think it might be overwhelming; this means that humans respond to the suffering of others based on their own self-interest.

== Compassion fatigue ==
Compassion fade and the collapse of compassion may be linked to the concept of compassion fatigue. Compassion fatigue happens to those in positions where a significant amount of time is spent responding to information related to suffering; this especially includes professions that are centered around helping others, like health care workers, educators, social workers, emergency responders, and so forth. In addition, people who take care of family members can experience this fatigue. They experience 'burnout', wherein they are emotionally and/or physically exhausted, thereby lessening their compassion and empathy for others in their work.

As such, the difference between compassion fade and compassion fatigue is that the former refers to the individual's attitude towards helping people whom they do not know, or aid needed in the world; in contrast, compassion fatigue is more concerned with the people whom the individual works and interacts with often.

Some research has suggested that it is the lack of suitable distress tolerance that gets people fatigued in compassion activities. It has been suggested that practice of nonjudgmental compassion can prevent fatigue and burnout.

== See also ==
- Effective altruism
- List of cognitive biases
- Moral emotions
- Moral psychology
- Slacktivism
