= Zhavoronkov =

Zhavoronkov is a Russian surname. People with the surname include:

- Alex Zhavoronkov (fl. 2010s–2020s), CEO of Insilico Medicine
- Semyon Zhavoronkov (1899–1967), Soviet naval officer
- Sergey Zhavoronkov (fl. 2010s), deputy of the Democratic Choice political party of Russia

== See also ==
- Zhavoronkovo, a rural locality in Russia
