= Beauty.AI =

Beauty.AI is a mobile beauty pageant for humans and a contest for programmers developing algorithms for evaluating human appearance. The mobile app and website created by Youth Laboratories that uses artificial intelligence technology to evaluate people's external appearance through certain algorithms, such as symmetry, facial blemishes, wrinkles, estimated age and age appearance, and comparisons to actors and models.

The Beauty.AI 2.0 contest caused great concern over important ethical issues with deep neural networks such as age, race and gender bias and lead to the creation of the Diversity.AI think tank dedicated to developing new methods for uncovering and managing bias in artificially intelligent systems. Beauty.AI was also an attempt to find approaches on how machines can perceive human face through evaluating particular features, commonly associated with health and beauty.

== Concept ==
The Beauty.AI app was created by Youth Laboratories, a company based out of Russia and Hong Kong that focuses on facial skin analytics. The bioinformation company Insilico Medicine assists in the Beauty.AI app by testing its deep learning techniques to the app. One goal of the app is to reduce the need for human and animal testing as well as improving people's overall health. Its first contest was started in December 2016, and the results were announced in August 2016. More than 60,000 people submitted entries into the contest.

The mobile app uses artificial intelligence technology to inspect photographs for certain facial features in order to both determine a person's beauty through artificial means by multiple robots.

Part of the Beauty.AI app's purpose is to collect visual and anecdotal data to improve its creator's Youth Laboratories skin analyst skills.

== Accusations of racism ==
There were a total of 44 individuals from different age groups and genders judged as the most attractive, with 37 white entrants, six Asian entrants, and one dark-skinned entrant. The app has received criticism from social justice advocates and computer science professionals.

However, Alex Zhavoronkov, PhD, chief science officer of Youth Laboratories and chief technology officer Konstantin Kiselev, both for Youth Laboratories, noted that a lack of data may have contributed to these results. Also, Kiselev added that another issue was that approximately 75% of entrants were white Europeans, whereas only 7% and 1% were from India and Africa, respectively. Kiselev stated that they would work on doing more and better outreach to these areas to improve in this area. Despite this, it was said by Dr. Zhavoronkov that the AI would discard photos of dark-skinned people if the lighting is too poor. Dr. Zhavoronkov vowed to weed out the issues for the next beauty pageant and to try to avoid a similar controversy in the future.
