= VITAL (machine learning software) =

- Original author: Unknown
- Developer: Deep Knowledge Venture
- Release: no
- Written in: unknown
- Operating system: unknown
- Platform: unknown
- License: unknown

VITAL (Validating Investment Tool for Advancing Life Sciences) was a Board Management Software machine learning proprietary software developed by Aging Analytics, a company registered in Bristol (England) and dissolved in 2017. Andrew Garazha (the firm's Senior Analyst) declared that the project aimed "through iterative releases and updates to create a piece of software capable of making autonomous investment decisions." According to Nick Dyer-Witheford, VITAL 1.0 was a "basic algorithm".

On 13 May 2014, Deep Knowledge Ventures, a Hong Kong venture capital firm, claimed to have appointed VITAL to its board of directors in order to prove that artificial intelligence could be an instrument for investment decision-making. The announcement received great press coverage despite the fact commentators consider this a publicity stunt. Fortune reported in 2019 that VITAL is no longer used.

== Criticism ==
Academics and journalists viewed VITAL's board appointment with skepticism. University of Sheffield computer science professor Noel Sharkey called it "a publicity hype". Michael Osborne, a University of Oxford associate professor in machine learning, found it is "a gimmick to call that an actual board member". Simon Sharwood of The Register, wrote there is "a strong whiff of stunt and/or promotion about this". In a 2019 speech, the Chief Scientist of Australia, Alan Finkel, commented, "At the time, most of us probably dismissed Vital as a PR exercise. I admit, I used her story three years ago to get a laugh in one of my speeches."

Florian Möslein, a law professor at the University of Marburg, wrote in 2018 that "Vital has widely been acknowledged as the 'world's first artificial intelligence company director'". Vice journalist Jason Koebler suggested that the software did not have any article intelligence capabilities and concluded "VITAL can’t talk, and it can’t hear, and it can’t be a real, functional executive of a company." Sharwood of The Register noted that because VITAL was not a natural person, it could not be a board member under Hong Kong's corporate governance laws. However, in a 2017 interview to The Nikkei, Dmitry Kaminskiy, managing partner of Deep Knowledge Ventures, stated that VITAL had observer status on the board and no voting rights.

University of Sheffield computer science professor Noel Sharkey said of VITAL, "On first sight, it looks like a futuristic idea but on reflection it is really a little bit of publicity hype." Vice journalist Jason Koebler said "this is a gimmick" and said "There is literally nothing to suggest that VITAL has any sort of capabilities beyond any other proprietary analysis software". Michael Osborne, a University of Oxford associate professor in machine learning, found VITAL's appointment to be noncredible, saying it is "a bit of a gimmick to call that an actual board member". Osborne said that a core duty of board members to converse with each other, which the algorithm is incapable of doing, so its more likely functionality is to serve as a springboard for conversation among other board members. In a 2019 speech, the Chief Scientist of Australia, Alan Finkel, commented, "At the time, most of us probably dismissed Vital as a PR exercise. I admit, I used her story three years ago to get a laugh in one of my speeches."

== Machine intelligence as board member ==
VITAL was created by a group of programmers employed by Aging Analytics According to Andrew Garazh, Aging Analytics Senior Analyst, VITAL was not a machine learning algorithm as the necessary datasets on investment rounds, intellectual property and clinical trial outcomes are generally not disclosed. Rather, VITAL used fuzzy logic based on 50 parameters to assess risk factors.

Aging Analytics licensed the software to Deep Knowledge Ventures. It was used to help the human board members of Deep Knowledge Venture make investment decisions in biotechnology companies. For instance, it supported investments in Insilico Medicine, which creates ways for computers to help find drugs in research into aging. VITAL also supported investing in Pathway Pharmaceuticals, which uses the OncoFinder algorithm to choose and appraise cancer treatments. According to Dmitry Kaminskiy, managing partner of Deep Knowledge Ventures, the motivation for using VITAL was the large number of failed investments in the biotechnology sector and the desire to avoid investing in companies likely to fail.

== Ethical and legal implications ==
Scholars addressed questions around the safety, privacy, accountability transparency and bias in algorithms.

Writing in the philosophical journal Multitudes, the academic Ariel Kyrou raised questions about the consequences of a mistake made by an algorithm recommending a dangerous investment. He raised the hypothetical where VITAL was able to persuade the board to invest in a startup that had the facade of doing research into treatment for age-associated ills, but in actuality was run by terrorists who were raising funds. Kyrou raised a series of questions about who society would fault for VITAL's mistake. As the owner of VITAL, should Deep Knowledge Ventures be held accountable, or rather should the companies that supplied data to VITAL or the people who created VITAL be held liable?

Simon Sharwood of The Register wrote that because the appointment of a software program to the board directors is not legally feasible in Hong Kong, there is "a strong whiff of stunt and/or promotion about this". Quoting a Thomson Reuters website describing Hong Kong legislation related to corporate governance, Sharwood pointed out that in Hong Kong "the board comprises all of the directors of the company" and "a director must normally be a natural person, except that a private company may have a body corporate as its director if the company is not a member of a listed group." He concluded that since VITAL cannot be considered a "natural person", it is merely a "cosmetic" appointment to the board and that "this software is no more a Board member than Caligula's horse was a senator". Sharwood further argued that corporations frequently purchase directors and officers liability insurance but that it would be practically impossible to get such insurance for VITAL. Sharwood also wrote that were VITAL to be hacked, any misinformation it outputs could be considered "false and misleading communications".

In the book Research Handbook on the Law of Artificial Intelligence, Florian Mölein wrote that VITAL could not become a director as defined in Hong Kong's corporate laws, so the other directors just were approaching it as "a member of [the] board with observer status". Lin Shaowei raised concerns in a Journal of East China University of Political Science and Law article about how the software's appearance inspired a complex question about the relationship between corporate law and artificial intelligence. VITAL could be considered either a board director who has voting rights or an observer who does not. Lin said either choice raised questions about whether VITAL is subject to corporate law and who would be held accountable if VITAL recommends a choice that turns out to be damaging to the company.

David Theo Goldberg in the Critical Times, a peer reviewed journal in Critical Global Theory, argues that VITAL processed a dataset to predict the most remunerative investment opportunities. Drawing his analysis on an article from Business Insider, Goldberg describes VITAL's decision-making predictiveness based "on surface pattern recognition and the identification of regularities and/or irregularities". In other words, Goldberg asserts that "the normativity of the surface" explains algorithmic knowledge of a "product" like VITAL.

In Homo Deus, Yuval Noah Harari mentions VITAL as an example of the future risks that humankind faces. Harari argues that the human mind is being replaced by a world in which algorithms and data make the decisions. Specifically, it is argued that "as algorithms push humans out of the job market," executive boards driven by artificial intelligence are more likely to give priority to algorithms over the humans.
