= Anecdotal evidence =

Evidence relying on personal testimony

Anecdotal evidence (or anecdata) is evidence based on descriptions and reports of individual, personal experiences, or observations, collected in a non-systematic manner.

The term anecdotal encompasses a variety of forms of evidence, including personal experiences, self-reported claims, eyewitness accounts of others, and those from fictional sources, making it a broad category that can lead to confusion due to its varied interpretations. Anecdotal evidence can be true or false but is not usually subjected to scholarly methods, scientific methods, or rules of legal, historical, academic, or intellectual rigor, meaning there are few or no safeguards against fabrication or inaccuracy. However, the use of anecdotal reports in advertising or promotion of a product, service, or idea may be considered a testimonial, which is highly regulated in certain jurisdictions.

The persuasiveness of anecdotal evidence compared to statistical evidence has been debated; some studies argue that people tend to overvalue anecdotal evidence, while others argue the opposite.

== Scientific context ==
In science, definitions of anecdotal evidence include:

- "casual observations/indications rather than rigorous or scientific analysis"
- "information passed along by word-of-mouth but not documented scientifically"
- "evidence that comes from an individual experience. This may be the experience of a person with an illness or the experience of a practitioner based on one or more patients outside a formal research study"
- "the report of an experience by one or more persons that is not objectively documented or an experience or outcome that occurred outside of a controlled environment"

Anecdotal evidence may be considered within the scope of scientific methods. Some anecdotal evidence can be both empirical and verifiable, e.g., case studies in medicine. Other anecdotal evidence does not qualify as scientific evidence because its nature prevents it from being investigated by the scientific method, such as folklore or intentionally fictional anecdotes. Anecdotal evidence is considered the least certain type of scientific literature. Researchers may use anecdotal evidence for suggesting new hypotheses but never as validating evidence.

Anecdotal evidence varies in formality. For instance, in medicine, published anecdotal evidence by a doctor, such as a case report, undergoes formal peer review. Although such evidence is seen as inconclusive, researchers sometimes regard it as an invitation to more rigorous scientific study. For instance, one study found that 35 of 47 anecdotal reports of drug side effects were later sustained as "clearly correct".

Where only one or a few anecdotes are presented, they risk being unreliable due to cherry-picking or otherwise non-representative sampling. Similarly, psychologists have found that due to cognitive bias, people are more likely to remember notable or unusual examples. Thus, anecdotal evidence is not necessarily representative of a typical experience even when accurate. Determination of whether an anecdote is typical requires statistical evidence. Misuse of anecdotal evidence in the form of argument from anecdote is an informal fallacy and is sometimes referred to as the "person who" or anecdotal fallacy, with statements like "I know a person who..." or "I know of a case where...". This places undue weight on possibly atypical experiences of close peers. If an anecdote illustrates a desired conclusion rather than a logical conclusion, it is considered a faulty generalization.

In medicine, anecdotal evidence may be subject to the placebo effect.

== Legal ==
In the legal sphere, anecdotal evidence, if it meets certain legal requirements and is admitted as testimony, is a common form of evidence in court. In many cases, anecdotal evidence is the only evidence presented at trial.

For testimony to be considered evidence, it must be given under oath, where the individual swears they will only testify to their own words and actions. Someone intentionally lying under oath is subject to perjury. However, these legal rigors do not make testimony in a court of law equal to scientific evidence. Testimony about another person's experiences or words is termed hearsay and is usually not admissible. However, hearsay that is not objected to by a judge is considered evidence for a jury. This means trials contain a considerable amount of anecdotal evidence that juries find relevant. Eyewitness testimony, a type of anecdotal evidence, is considered the most compelling form of evidence by a jury.

== See also ==
- Anecdotal value – Use of anecdotes in education
- Argument from ignorance – Informal fallacy
- Confirmation bias – Bias confirming existing attitudes
- Correlation does not imply causation – Refutation of a logical fallacy
- Empirical evidence – Knowledge acquired by means of the senses
- Eyewitness testimony – Account a witness gives in the courtroom of what they observed
- Fallacy – Argument that uses faulty reasoning
- Faulty generalization – Conclusion made on the basis of one or few instances of a phenomenon
- List of fallacies
- Lived experience – Phenomenological concept
- Post hoc ergo propter hoc – Fallacy of assumption of causation based on sequence of events
- Presumption of guilt – Presumption that a person is guilty of a crime
