= Insilico Medicine =

Biotechnology company

- Type: Public
- Traded as: SEHK: 3696
- Industry: Biotechnology
- Founded: 2014
- Founder: Alex Zhavoronkov
- Headquarters: 1000 Massachusetts Avenue, Cambridge, MA;
- Number of locations: 6
- Area served: Artificial intelligence, deep learning
- Key people: Alex Zhavoronkov, PhD, Feng Ren, PhD, Alex Aliper
- Services: Drug discovery
- Website: insilico.com

Insilico Medicine is a biotechnology company headquartered in Boston, Massachusetts, with additional facilities in Pak Shek Kok, Hong Kong in Hong Kong Science Park near the Chinese University of Hong Kong, and in New York, at The Cure by Deerfield. The company applies genomics, big data analysis, and deep learning for in silico drug discovery.

== History ==
In 2011, Alex Zhavoronkov published an article in the journal PLOS ONE with Dr. Charles Cantor, previously director of the Human Genome Project at the Department of Energy (DOE) and founder of Sequenom on the International Aging Research Portfolio (IARP), establishing a public data set tracking government research funding and outcomes. This work formed the basis for an artificial intelligence (AI) pharmacological analysis platform.

Zhavoronkov assertedly founded Insilico Medicine in 2014 as an alternative to animal testing for research and development programs in the pharmaceutical industry, using AI and deep-learning techniques to analyze how a compound will affect cells and what drugs can be used to treat the cells in addition to possible side effects. Through its Pharma.AI division, the company provides machine learning services to different pharmaceutical, biotechnology, and skin care companies.

The company has multiple collaborations in the applications of next-generation artificial intelligence technologies such as the generative adversarial networks (GANs) and reinforcement learning to the generation of novel molecular structures with desired properties. In 2016, Insilico published an algorithm that it called the "Insilico Pathway Activation Network Decomposition Analysis" or "iPANDA" algorithm, asserted to allow researchers "to quickly and efficiently analyze signaling and metabolic pathway perturbation states using gene expression data". A 2015 papers in Nature Communications described the iPANDA dimensionality reduction algorithm. In conjunction with Alan Aspuru-Guzik's group at Harvard, they published a journal article about an improved GAN architecture for molecular generation which combines GANs, reinforcement learning, and a differentiable neural computer.

In 2017, Insilico was named one of the Top five AI companies by NVIDIA for its potential for social impact. Insilico has R&D resources in Belgium, Russia, and the UK and hires talent through hackathons and other local competitions. By mid-2017, Insilico had raised $8.26 million in funding from investors including Deep Knowledge Ventures, JHU A-Level Capital, Jim Mellon, and Juvenescence. In 2019 it raised another $37 million from Fidelity Investments, Eight Roads Ventures, Qiming Venture Partners, WuXi AppTec, Baidu, Sinovation, Lilly Asia Ventures, Pavilion Capital, BOLD Capital, and other investors.

The company "focused exclusively on drug discovery until 2019 when it began developing its own therapeutics". In January 2021, Insilico entered into a partnership with Fosun Pharma, to facilitate entry into the Chinese market. Later in 2021 after developing a novel preclinical candidate molecule for a novel target, the company announced a $255 million series C round from Warburg Pincus, Sequoia Capital, Orbimed, Mirae Asset Financial Group, and over 25 biotechnology, AI, and pharmaceutical investors. By mid-2021, it claimed to have nominated eight preclinical candidates. Another $60 million in new Series D financing was raised in 2022. As of 2023 it was reported that over $400 million had been invested in the company. In 2023, Zhavoronkov stated that he "moved the company's R&D to China to capitalize on 'half a trillion dollars' worth of infrastructure and hundreds of thousands of scientists [provided by the government] to enable AI-designed drugs". In mid-2024, it was reported that the corporate headquarters had relocated to Boston, Massachusetts. In November 2024, Insilico was named one of the top 50 AI innovators by Fortune magazine, and in November 2025, it was named one of the 50 leading corporate institutions in biological science research for 2025 by the journal Nature. The company went public on the Hong Kong Stock Exchange in late 2025, raising nearly $293 million.

In March 2026, an agreement was signed with Eli Lilly for AI-driven drug discovery, valued at $2.75 billion, including an upfront payment of $115 million to Insilico. With this deal, Eli Lilly secured exclusive global rights to manufacture and market a range of oral therapies developed using Insilico’s AI. The two companies have been partners since 2025.

== International operations ==
In addition to its operations based in the United States, including its headquarters in Boston, Massachusetts, and in New York, at The Cure by Deerfield, and previous headquarters in Baltimore, Maryland, Insilico has facilities and ties with governmental and private institutions in various other countries. As of September 2024, it was reported that the company had "350 people spread across Cambridge, San Francisco, New York, Montreal, Abu Dhabi, Hong Kong, Taiwan, and mainland China".

=== Canada ===
Insilico Medicine Canada Inc. launched its Montreal R&D center in June 2022, and held a formal inauguration event for the center in November 2023. The entity has maintained ties with the Canadian government and government-funded agencies since its inception.

=== Hong Kong ===
Insilico maintains facilities in Pak Shek Kok, Hong Kong in Hong Kong Science Park near the Chinese University of Hong Kong. InSilico Medicine Hong Kong Limited, was founded as a subsidiary in 2019, within the Hong Kong Science and Technology Parks Corporation (HKSTP) ecosystem. The company is listed in HKSTP's company directory. In September 2025, the Hong Kong Investment Corporation (HKIC), a patient-capital institution wholly owned by the Hong Kong SAR Government, highlighted an investment and strategic partnership relationship with Insilico.

=== Russia ===
In 2016, the company's Russian subsidiary, Insilico LLC, became a resident of the biomedical cluster of the Skolkovo Project. Insilico reported that it had fully disposed of the subsidiary by October 2022. Zhavoronkov emphasized the infrastructural and organizational support provided by the innovation center.

This subsidiary became one of the largest recipients of grant funding from the Skolkovo Foundation. According to publicly available grant data, the company's project to apply the iPANDA signaling pathway analysis algorithm and deep learning methods to omics data for drug discovery received a grant of 89.99 million rubles, putting it in the top ten largest grant recipients of the foundation. After the Russian invasion of Ukraine in 2022, Insilico shifted operatios to the United Arab Emirates and its website and other official materials no longer reflected earlier activities and affiliations in Russia. Insilico reported having fully disposed of its Russian subsidiary by October 2022.

=== United Arab Emirates ===
In February 2023, Insilico opened a regional office and Middle East headquarters at the International Renewable Energy Agency (IRENA) Building in Masdar City, Abu Dhabi, with a grand opening event there attended by government and industry leaders, including UAE Minister of AI, Omar Al Olama. In 2025, Insilico signed a memorandum of understanding with United Arab Emirates University in Al Ain, establishing joint research projects, student internships, and workshops focused on biotechnology and AI-driven drug discovery.

== Research ==
The company "applies DL, big data, and genomics for in silico drug discovery" for various conditions. It has sought to develop AI to "identify novel drug targets for untreated diseases", and has pursued dual-purpose therapeutics for "a specific disease or several diseases while targeting ageing at the same time".

In 2019, the company in partnership with researchers at the University of Toronto, used AI to design potential new drugs. One was reported to have shown promising initial results when tested in mice. Research areas for therapeutics have included fibrosis, immunology, oncology and the central nervous system. To demonstrate the capacity of their proprietary AI platforms, the company published two projects on identifying therapeutic targets for ageing and amyotrophic lateral sclerosis in 29 March and 28 June 2022, respectively.

The company has collaborated with scientists at the University of Chicago, George Mason University, and University of Liverpool, focusing on ageing. For ALS, the company worked with researchers from Answer ALS, Johns Hopkins University School of Medicine, Harvard Medical School, Mayo Clinic, Tsinghua University, and 4B Technologies Limited. In 2023, it was reported that Insilico had initiated "one of the first mid-stage human trials of a drug discovered and designed by artificial intelligence".

As of 2026, the company's experimental drug Rentosertib was undergoing a phase 3 clinical trial. In September 2026, the company published a study claiming that 6 independent proteomic ageing clocks reported reduced biological age in the treatment arm of a phase 2a clinical trial for the drug. Separate pathway analyses "identified potential anti-aging shifts in senescence and metabolic processes".

Outside of human drugs, in 2021 the company partnered with Swiss company Syngenta weedkillers.

== See also ==
- XtalPi
