= TNIK =

Protein-coding gene in the species Homo sapiens

Identifiers
- Aliases: TNIK, TRAF2 and NCK interacting kinase, MRT54
- External IDs: OMIM: 610005; MGI: 1916264; GeneCards: TNIK
Available structures
PDB	Ortholog search: PDBe RCSB
PDB	List of PDB id codes 2X7F, 5CWZ, 5AX9
Enzyme activity
EC #	BRENDA	ExPASy	KEGG	MetaCyc
2.7.11.1	↗	↗	↗	↗

Gene location (Human)
Chr.	Chromosome 3 (human)
Band	3q26.2-q26.31	Start	171,058,414 bp
Band	3q26.2-q26.31	End	171,460,408 bp

Gene location (Mouse)
Chr.	Chromosome 3 (mouse)
Band	3|3 A3	Start	28,317,363 bp
Band	3|3 A3	End	28,730,007 bp
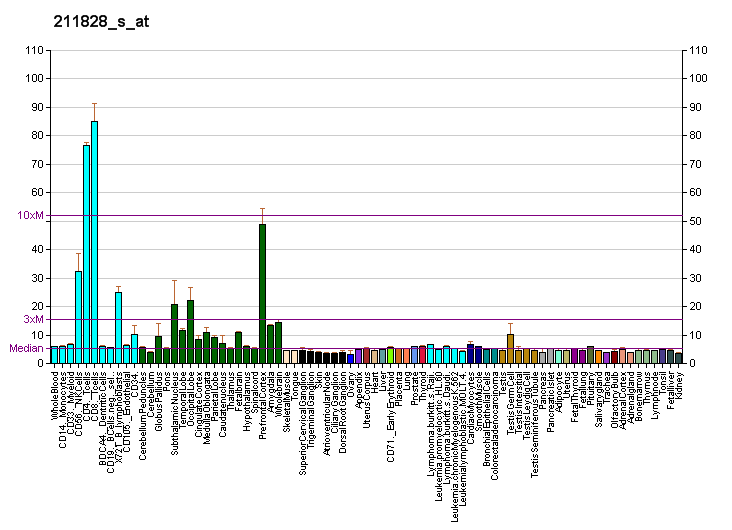

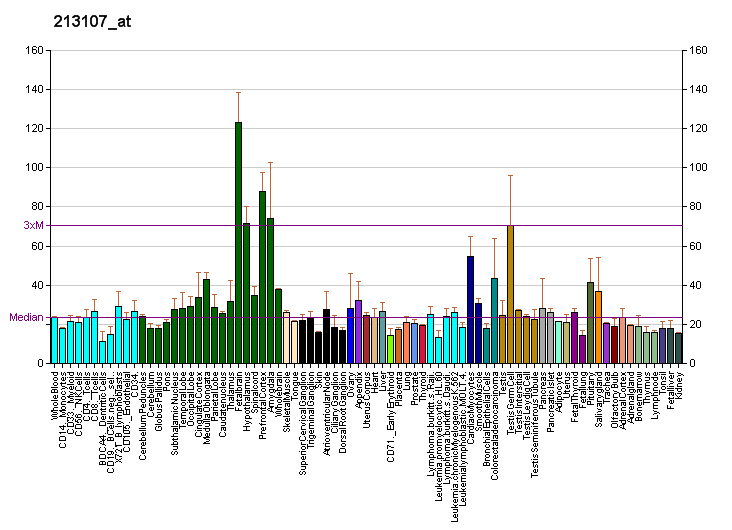

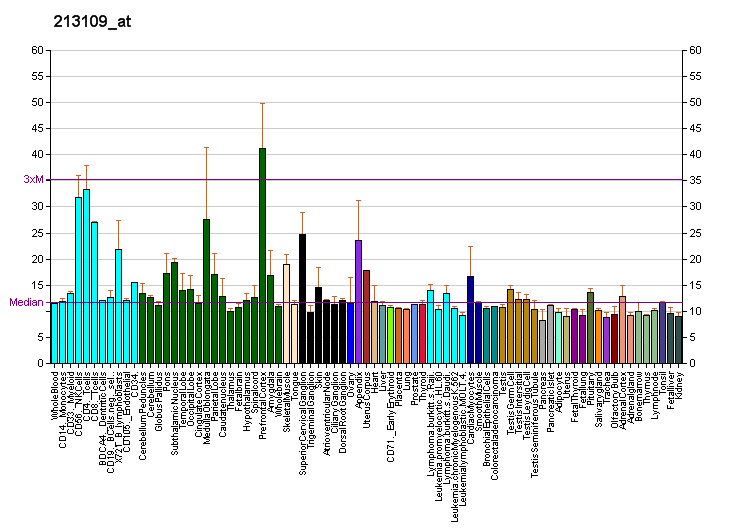
RNA expression pattern
Bgee	Human / Mouse (ortholog); Top expressed in: oocyte; caudate nucleus; jejunal mucosa; secondary oocyte; nucleus accumbens; putamen; corpus callosum; internal globus pallidus; duodenum; Brodmann area 46 / Top expressed in: superior cervical ganglion; lateral septal nucleus; trigeminal ganglion; ventromedial nucleus; temporal lobe; mammillary body; lateral hypothalamus; superior frontal gyrus; amygdala; olfactory bulb; More reference expression data
BioGPS	More reference expression data
Gene ontology
Molecular function	transferase activity; protein kinase activity; nucleotide binding; kinase activity; protein serine/threonine kinase activity; protein binding; ATP binding; MAP kinase kinase kinase kinase activity
Cellular component	cytoplasm; recycling endosome; endosome; nucleoplasm; apical plasma membrane; extracellular exosome; cytoskeleton; nucleus; cytosol; presynapse; glutamatergic synapse; postsynaptic density, intracellular component
Biological process	actin cytoskeleton reorganization; microvillus assembly; positive regulation of protein phosphorylation; intracellular signal transduction; phosphorylation; Wnt signaling pathway; nervous system development; regulation of dendrite morphogenesis; protein phosphorylation; cytoskeleton organization; protein autophosphorylation; protein localization to plasma membrane; regulation of mitotic cell cycle; regulation of apoptotic process; MAPK cascade; signal transduction; stress-activated protein kinase signaling cascade; activation of protein kinase activity; neuron projection morphogenesis
Sources:Amigo / QuickGO
Orthologs
Databases	NCBI: entry; OMA: entry
Species	Human	Mouse
Entrez	23043	665113
Ensembl	ENSG00000154310	ENSMUSG00000027692
UniProt	Q9UKE5	P83510
RefSeq (mRNA)	NM_001161560; NM_001161561; NM_001161562; NM_001161563; NM_001161564 NM_001161565; NM_001161566; NM_015028	NM_001163007; NM_001163008; NM_001163009; NM_026910
RefSeq (protein)	NP_001155032; NP_001155033; NP_001155034; NP_001155035; NP_001155036 NP_001155037; NP_001155038; NP_055843	NP_001156479; NP_001156480; NP_001156481; NP_081186
Location (UCSC)	Chr 3: 171.06 – 171.46 Mb	Chr 3: 28.32 – 28.73 Mb
PubMed search
- Wikidata
View/Edit Human	View/Edit Mouse

TRAF2 and NCK-interacting protein kinase is an enzyme that in humans is encoded by the TNIK gene. TNIK is involved in various cellular processes, including signal transduction, gene transcription, and cytoskeletal organization. As an emerging area of therapeutic research, TNIK inhibitors have shown potential in addressing a range of diseases, including cancer, neurological disorders, and inflammatory conditions.

== Structure ==
Germinal center kinases (GCKs), such as TNIK, are characterized by an N-terminal kinase domain and a C-terminal GCK domain that serves a regulatory function.

== Function ==
TNIK is a serine/threonine kinase that plays a central role in diverse cellular processes, most notably as a key regulator of the Wnt signaling pathway. TNIK is recruited to the promoters of Wnt target genes where it interacts with both β-catenin and TCF4; it phosphorylates TCF4 to enable TCF/LEF-dependent transcriptional activation of Wnt target genes, a function critical for cell proliferation and stem cell maintenance, especially in intestinal and cancerous tissues.

== Interactions ==
TNIK has been shown to interact with KIAA0090, although the significance is unclear. TNIK has been shown to phosphorylate Gelsolin, a protein involved in F-actin depolymerisation thus inducing cytoskeletal changes.

== Clinical significance ==
TNIK appears to play an important role in pulmonary fibrosis and as of 2025 TNIK inhibitors were being explored in clinical trials for pulmonary fibrosis. TNIK has increasingly been of interest in research into the biology of ageing. Rentosertib, an investigational new drug targeting TNIK, was the subject of a phase 2a trial conducted in China, testing the drug in 71 IPF patients from July 2023 to June 2024, encompassing an administration period of 12 weeks.
