= Rentosertib =

Chemical compound

Rentosertib INN: Rentosertib

Clinical data
- Other names: ISM001-055; INS018_055
- Routes of administration: Oral

Identifiers
- IUPAC name: [2,5′-Bi-1H-imidazole]-5-carboxamide, 4′-(4-fluorophenyl)-1′-(1-methylethyl)-N-[4-(4-methyl-1-piperazinyl)phenyl]
- CAS Number: 2828567-39-9
- PubChem CID: 164938183
- DrugBank: DB18083
- ChemSpider: 129742237
- UNII: M9NU5G8WXY

Chemical and physical data
- Formula: C_{27}H_{30}FN_{7}O
- Molar mass: 487.583 g·mol^{−1}
- 3D model (JSmol): Interactive image
- SMILES: CC(C)N1C=NC(=C1C2=NC=C(N2)C(=O)NC3=CC=C(C=C3)N4CCN(CC4)C)C5=CC=C(C=C5)F
- InChI: InChI=1S/C27H30FN7O/c1-18(2)35-17-30-24(19-4-6-20(28)7-5-19)25(35)26-29-16-23(32-26)27(36)31-21-8-10-22(11-9-21)34-14-12-33(3)13-15-34/h4-11,16-18H,12-15H2,1-3H3,(H,29,32)(H,31,36); Key:ZVDNXHUSIKGTSF-UHFFFAOYSA-N

Rentosertib (also known as ISM001‑055 and INS018_055) is an investigational new drug that under evaluation for the treatment of idiopathic pulmonary fibrosis (IPF). It targets TNIK (TRAF2 and NCK-interacting protein kinase). It is asserted to be the first drug generated entirely by generative artificial intelligence to reach phase 3 human clinical trials, and the first to target a novel, AI-discovered biological pathway.

== Development ==
Rentosertib was developed by Insilico Medicine using a generative AI platform designed to identify novel disease-associated targets and rapidly design optimized small-molecule inhibitors. TNIK was identified as a central regulator of fibrosis and inflammation in IPF. Rentosertib selectively inhibits TNIK, and progressed from target discovery through phase 0 and 1 clinical trials in under 30 months.

== Clinical trials ==
A multicenter, double-blind, placebo-controlled, randomized phase 2a trial was conducted in China, testing the drug in 71 IPF patients from July 2023 to June 2024, encompassing an administration period of 12 weeks. Participants were randomly assigned to receive 30 mg once daily (QD), 30 mg twice daily (BID), 60 mg QD, or placebo. The trial's primary endpoint was the incidence of treatment-emergent adverse events (TEAEs).

As of 2026, the drug was undergoing a phase 3 clinical trial.

In September 2026, the company published a study claiming that 6 independent proteomic ageing clocks all reported reduced biological age in the treatment arm of a phase 2a clinical trial. Separate pathway analyses "identified potential anti-aging shifts in senescence and metabolic processes".

== Nomenclature ==
In March 2025, the United States Adopted Names (USAN) Council approved "Rentosertib" as the official nonproprietary name for ISM001-055.
