= Identifiable victim effect =

Psychological bias

The identifiable victim effect is the tendency of individuals to offer greater aid when a specific, identifiable person ("victim") is observed under hardship, as compared to a large, vaguely defined group with the same need.

The identifiable victim effect has two components. People are more inclined to help an identified victim than an unidentified one, and people are more inclined to help a single identified victim than a group of identified victims. Although helping an identified victim may be commendable, the identifiable victim effect is considered a cognitive bias. From a consequentialist point of view, the cognitive error is the failure to offer N times as much help to N unidentified victims.

The identifiable victim effect has a mirror image that is sometimes called the identifiable perpetrator effect. Research has shown that individuals are more inclined to mete out punishment, even at their own expense, when they are punishing a specific, identified perpetrator.

The conceptualization of the identifiable victim effect as it is known today is commonly attributed to American economist Thomas Schelling. He wrote that harm to a particular person invokes "anxiety and sentiment, guilt and awe, responsibility and religion, [but]…most of this awesomeness disappears when we deal with statistical death".

Historical figures from Joseph Stalin to Mother Teresa are credited with statements that epitomize the identifiable victim effect. The remark "One death is a tragedy; a million deaths is a statistic" is widely, although incorrectly, attributed to Stalin. The remark "If I look at the mass I will never act. If I look at the one, I will," is attributed to Mother Teresa.

== Examples ==
This article mentions many historical incidents that have been cited as examples of the identifiable victim effect. These incidents serve as illustrative examples but do not constitute evidence that the effect exists.

=== Arrest of Rosa Parks ===
The conviction of Rosa Parks in 1955 for refusing to give up her bus seat in favor of a White passenger inspired the Black community to boycott the Montgomery, Alabama buses for over a year. Parks appealed her conviction, but her case never reached the U.S. Supreme Court. The Court found bus segregation unconstitutional in Browder v. Gayle, a case with four plaintiffs. Parks remains a symbol of resistance to racial segregation in the United States, while the four Browder v. Gayle plaintiffs are much less well known.

=== 'Baby Jessica' in the well ===
On October 14, 1987, 18-month old Jessica McClure fell into a narrow well in her aunt's backyard in Midland, Texas. Within hours, 'Baby Jessica', as she became known, made headlines around the US. The public reacted with sympathy towards her ordeal. While teams of rescue workers, paramedics and volunteers worked to successfully rescue 'Baby Jessica' in 58 hours, the public donated hundreds of thousands of dollars to her family. Even after Jessica was discharged from the hospital, the McClure family was flooded with cards and gifts from members of the public as well as a visit from then-Vice President George H.W. Bush and a telephone call from then-President Ronald Reagan.

=== Drowning of Alan Kurdi ===
In September, 2015, three-year-old Syrian refugee Alan (or Aylan) Kurdi drowned when he and his family tried to reach Europe by boat. A photograph of Kurdi's body caused a dramatic upturn in international concern over the refugee crisis. The picture has been credited with causing a surge in donations to charities helping migrants and refugees, with one charity, the Migrant Offshore Aid Station, recording a 15-fold increase in donations within 24 hours of its publication.

=== Murder of George Floyd ===
The murder of George Floyd by a police officer in May, 2020 led to worldwide protests against police brutality. Almost 1,000 people are killed in the U.S. by police every year, and a black male is 2.5 times as likely to be killed by police as a white male. However, people tend to be upset with specific instances of suffering, rather than larger trends.

== Strength of the effect ==
=== Meta-analysis of experimental evidence ===
A meta-analysis of studies through 2015 of the identifiable victim effect found that not all studies achieve statistical significance, and the effect size, in general, is small. In an experiment more recent than the meta-analysis, identifying a victim in COVID-19 messaging had no meaningful effect on pro-health behaviors such as hand-washing, mask-wearing, and staying at home.

On the other hand, extremely subtle experimental manipulations may yield significant effects. For example, Small and Loewenstein found that when the victim is identified only by a number, subjects are more inclined to help the victim if they know the victim's number when they decide whether to help than if they learn the number later.

The meta-analysis found that statistical significance is enhanced and the effect size is increased under the following circumstances:

- if the identified victim is a child
- if a photograph of the victim is shown
- if the victim's plight is caused by poverty rather than disease or injury
- if the victim is perceived as not responsible for his/her plight

=== Vividness ===
Information that identifies a victim may include vivid details such as photographs, video, and a description of the victim's predicament. The victim may be portrayed as innocent and helpless. These details evoke emotional responses and provide a sense of familiarity and social closeness. Therefore, identified victims may elicit greater support than statistical victims.

Studies have found that people respond more to concrete, graphic information than abstract, statistical information. Bohnet and Frey (1999) and Kogut and Ritov (2005) found that vividness contributes to the identifiable victim effect. Another study by Kogut and Ritov (2005) found that donations to benefit a needy child increased when the name and a picture of the child were provided. Jenni and Loewenstein (1997) did not observe an effect of vividness.

In 2003, Deborah Small and George Loewenstein conducted an experiment showing that the identifiable victim effect does not result from vividness alone. Victims were identified only by number. Participants selected the victim to whom they could donate by picking a victim's number out of a bag. Participants donated significantly more money if they picked the victim's number before donating rather than afterward. They donated more to an already identified victim even though the victim's identity was hidden from them.

=== Singularity effect ===
The identifiable victim effect disappears when a group of victims, rather than a single victim, is identified. In a group of two or more victims, identifying every victim makes no difference. For example, a 2005 study by Kogut and Ritov asked participants how much they would be willing to donate to either a critically ill child or a group of eight critically ill children. Although identifying the individual child increased donations, identifying every child in the group of eight did not.

Paul Slovic argued that our compassion fades as the number of victims increases, and eventually collapses. He and his colleagues found that experimental subjects donated less to help two starving children than to help one.

=== When the victim can be blamed ===
Research suggests that if an individual is seen as responsible for their plight, people offer less help if the victim is identified. Most research dedicated to the identifiable victim effect avoids the topic of blame, using explicitly blameless individuals, such as children suffering from an illness. However, there are real-world situations where victims may be seen as to blame for their current situation. For example, in a 2011 study by Kogut, individuals were less likely to offer help to an AIDS victim if the victim had contracted AIDS through sexual contact than if the individual was born with AIDS. In other words, individuals were less likely to offer help to victims if they were seen as at least partially responsible for their plight. A meta-study conducted in 2016 supports these findings, reporting that charitable donations were highest when the victim showed little responsibility for their victimization.

In such cases where victim blaming is possible, identification of individuals may not induce sympathy and may actually increase negative perception of the victim. This reduction in help is even more pronounced if the individual believes in the just world fallacy, which is the tendency for people to blame the victim for what has happened to them. This pattern of blame results from a desire to believe that the world is predictable and orderly and that those who suffer must have done something to deserve their suffering.

== Explanations ==
Researchers have proposed various underlying causes of the identifiable victim effect, which may work together to produce the effect. These possible causes are given below, and experimental tests are cited.

=== Emotional reactions ===
According to the affect heuristic, people make decisions based on emotions rather than objective analysis. A single identified victim may trigger a stronger emotional response than a group of unidentified victims. Several studies have found that identifying a victim evokes more sympathy for the victim and more distress at the victim's plight, along with more willingness to help.

Kogut and Ritov, for example, asked participants how much they would donate to help a critically ill child. When they identified the child, feelings of distress at the child's plight increased along with donations. This supports the idea that altruistic acts may serve as coping mechanisms to alleviate negative emotions, such as distress or guilt.

=== Effect of reference group size ===
Risk that is concentrated is perceived as greater than the same risk dispersed over a wider population. Identifiable victims are their own reference group; if they do not receive aid then the entire reference group will perish. For example, Fetherstonhaugh et al found that an intervention saving a fixed number of lives was considered less beneficial when more total lives were at risk.

Jenni and Loewenstein's experimental subjects showed significantly more support for risk-reducing actions when a higher proportion of the reference group was at risk. This effect was so striking that Jenni and Loewenstein suggested that the identifiable victim effect could instead be called the "percentage of reference group saved effect".

=== Perceived responsibility ===
People tend to feel more responsibility for victims who are psychologically closer to them, and people may feel closer to an identified victim. Indeed, several studies have found that individuals feel more responsibility for an identified victim.

=== Identified vs statistical victims ===
Some victims cannot be identified because they are statistical. For example, we do not know whose lives would be saved if 10% more of the population were vaccinated against a disease. There are several theoretical reasons to suspect that identified victims are more likely to be helped than statistical ones:

- People underestimate the importance of outcomes that are merely probable rather than certain. If the money sent to Baby Jessica when she was trapped in the well had been spent on preventative health care for children, many lives might plausibly have been saved, but Jessica certainly would have died if she had not been rescued in time.
  In one of Jenni and Loewenstein's two experiments comparing certain and uncertain deaths, their subjects were significantly more concerned about certain deaths.
- People regret losses more than they enjoy equivalent gains. In the Baby Jessica example above, the death of Jessica if she had not been rescued would have been a tragic loss, but the children's lives that might have been saved through preventative health care were framed as gains.
- The decision to help an identified victim is made ex post, after the victim is in danger, but the decision to save a statistical victim is often made ex ante, to prevent danger to the individual. People may feel a responsibility to an actual identified victim but not to a possible victim of a future tragedy that might not occur. This explanation is closest to what Thomas Schelling implied in his now-famous paper.
  Jenni and Loewenstein (1997) did not find evidence that ex post vs ex ante evaluation contributes to the identifiable victim effect, but Small and Lowenstein (2003) did.

Indeed, researchers have generally found that identified victims are more likely to be helped than statistical ones. For example, Small, Loewenstein, and Slovic found that subjects donated much more money to help a single starving girl named Rokia than to relieve a famine described statistically.

== Relation to other cognitive biases ==
The identifiable victim effect is a special case of a more general phenomenon: people respond to stories more readily than to facts. Kubin et al found that people have more respect for their political opponents' opinions when their opponents support their opinions with personal experiences rather than facts. In keeping with the literature on the identifiable victim effect, they found that personal experiences involving harm are particularly effective.

The preference for helping a single individual rather than a group is sometimes called the singularity effect. Indifference to the number of individuals helped is called scope neglect or scope insensitivity.

The identifiable victim effect has a mirror image that is sometimes called the identifiable perpetrator effect. Research has shown that individuals are more inclined to mete out punishment, even at their own expense, when they are punishing a specific, identified perpetrator. They also exert more severe punishments and express stronger feelings of blame and anger. Even when the perpetrator is identified only by a number, subjects are more inclined to punish if they know the perpetrator's number when they decide whether to punish than if they learn the number later. This effect has also been called the "Goldstein effect," after the fictional Emmanuel Goldstein, who was vilified as the supposed enemy of the state in George Orwell's dystopian novel 1984.

These two effects, of identifiable victims and identifiable perpetrators, suggest that there is a more general identifiable other effect, such that any identified individual evokes a stronger reaction than an equivalent but unidentified individual.

== Implications ==
=== Public policy and politics ===
==== Healthcare ====
The identifiable victim effect may also influence healthcare, both at the individual and national level. On the individual level, doctors are more likely to recommend expensive, but potentially life-saving, treatments to an individual patient rather than to a group of patients. This effect is not limited to medical professionals, as laymen demonstrate this same bias towards providing more expensive treatments for individual patients. On the national level, the American people are far more likely to contribute to an expensive treatment to save the life of one person rather than spend much smaller amounts on preventative measures that could save the lives of thousands per year. A function of American individualism, this nationwide bias towards expensive treatments is still prevalent today.

===== Brady Bill =====
James S. Brady, the then-White House press secretary, was among three collateral damage victims in the attempted assassination of President Reagan in 1981. Brady was explicitly named in reports of the shooting in contrast to the other two injured, a District of Columbia police officer and a Secret Service agent. The political reaction was largely focused on the injuries of Brady which led to the enactment of the Brady Handgun Violence Prevention Act of 1993. It states that it is mandatory for firearm dealers to perform background searches on firearm purchasers.

===== Ryan White Care Act =====
The need to tackle the problems faced by AIDS sufferers was brought to the political forefront as a result of the legal and social plight of one particular AIDS victim, Ryan White, who contracted HIV at age 13 and died of AIDS six years later. His circumstances and his campaign for greater funding for AIDS research were widely publicised in the media. Following his death in 1990, the US Congress passed the Ryan White Care Act, which funded the largest set of services for people living with AIDS in the country.

==== Defunding peacekeeping efforts in Darfur ====
In November 2005, the U.S. Congress stripped $50 million from a bill that would have funded peacekeeping efforts in Darfur, where genocide was claiming hundreds of thousands of lives.

Less than a month earlier, Rosa Parks had died. Her casket had lain in state at the rotunda of the U.S. Capitol, and many elected officials, including President George W. Bush, had attended her memorial service. Genocide expert Paul Slovic wrote, "We appropriately honor the one, Rosa Parks, but by turning away from the crisis in Darfur we are, implicitly, placing almost no value on the lives of millions there."

==== George Santos' misstatements ====
Republican politician George Santos was elected to Congress in a formerly Democratic district after falsely claiming that his mother was a 9/11 casualty and his maternal grandparents were Jewish Holocaust refugees who had fled Soviet Ukraine and German-occupied Belgium. In reality, his mother, who died in 2016, was not in the United States on September 11, 2001. His maternal grandparents actually lived in Brazil. Whether Santos would have been elected if he had not made these (and other) false statements is unknown.

==== Criminal justice ====
Since the identifiable victim effect can influence punishment, it has the potential to undermine the system of trial by jury. Jurors, when deliberating, work with an identifiable alleged perpetrator, and thus may attach negative emotions (e.g. disgust, anger) to the individual or assign increased blame when handing down a harsh sentence. Policymakers, who are unable to see the individual offender, being almost entirely emotionally removed, may actually have intended a more lenient sentence. This may produce a harsher verdict than the legal guidelines recommend or allow. On the other extreme, jurors may feel sympathy, relating with the perpetrator on a level not experienced by policymakers, leading to a milder verdict than legally appropriate or allowable.

Typically in crime investigations, law enforcement forces conceal any information regarding the identities of the suspects until they have strong evidence that the suspects are credible. When identities of suspects are revealed through description of their features or release of their images, media coverage and public discussion on the issue grows. On one side, the public discourse can become increasingly negative and hostile, or, if the perpetrator is sympathetic, support for the perpetrator may grow. This is because people experience a greater emotional reaction towards a concrete, identifiable perpetrator than an abstract, unidentifiable one.

=== Business ethics ===
Yam and Reynolds speculated that the growing anonymity of parties to business transactions may contribute to an increase in unethical business behavior. They hypothesized that because of increasing corporate size, the ubiquity of e-commerce, and the commoditization of workers, business executives are less likely to know their employees, customers, and shareholders, and therefore they might be more willing to exploit these unidentified potential victims.

In one of their experiments, they asked their subjects if they would approve of withholding a drug from the market if releasing it later would bring a greater profit. Their experimental subjects voiced more approval for withholding the drug if all of the victims of the disease the drug treats were unidentified than if one of the victims was named.

Other researchers suggested that outside observers, not only perpetrators, view unethical behavior as less unethical if the victim of the unethical behavior is unidentified. This could possibly result in less public outcry against unethical practices in a globalized business environment, where the victims are often unseen.

== Personality differences among potential helpers ==
=== Attachment anxiety ===
High levels of attachment anxiety may increase the power of identifiable victim effect.

When presented with an identified victim, individuals with high levels of attachment anxiety tend to donate more money than the average individual. Research suggests that anxiously attached people experience significantly more personal distress than those securely attached when confronted with victims in need, so they donate more in order to relieve their distress.

When presented with an unidentified victim, individuals with high levels of attachment anxiety tend to donate less money than the average individual. Research suggests that unidentified victims do not provoke distress, and that anxiously attached people focus on their own vulnerabilities, so that they have less inclination to help unidentified others.

Although anxiously attached people may participate in prosocial behaviors, such as donating money to a charity, researchers hypothesize that their actions are not the result of altruistic tendencies, but instead are "positively correlated with egoistic, rather than altruistic motives for helping and volunteering," and that anxiously attached people engage in pro-social behavior mainly when strenuous effort is not required.

=== Guilt ===
Yam and Reynolds investigated the propensity to victimize others. Their experimental subjects harmed unidentified others more than named others, and anticipated that harming named others would provoke more guilt than harming unidentified others. The experimenters did not test whether people who are more prone to feelings of guilt experience the identified victim effect more intensely.

=== Reasoning style ===
Research suggests that individual differences in reasoning style moderate the identifiable victim effect. Two different methods of reasoning are "experiential" and "rational". Experiential thinking (e.g. emotionally-based thinking) is automatic, contextual and fluid, and rational thinking (e.g. logically based thinking) is deliberative, analytical, and decontextualized. Experiential thinking styles may increase the power of the identifiable victim effect, and rational thinking styles may decrease the power of the identifiable victim effect. Researchers theorize that these differences result because experiential thinkers rely on emotional responses towards an issue when making a decision. In contrast, rational thinkers analyze the situation as a whole before making a decision. Thus, a person thinking rationally would respond to all victims equally, not giving preference to those specifically named or otherwise identified, just as experiential thinkers would be drawn towards the more emotionally charged identified victim. However, research conducted during the COVID-19 pandemic found that identifiable victim effects on public health promoting behaviors were not only undetected, but also not mediated by behavioral tests of reasoning style.

== See also ==
- Compassion fade
- List of cognitive biases
- Moral psychology
