= Anecdotal value =

Use of anecdotes in education

In communication studies, science communication, psycholinguistics and choice theory, anecdotal value refers to the primarily social and political value of an anecdote or anecdotal evidence in promoting understanding of a social, cultural, or economic phenomenon. While anecdotal evidence is typically unscientific, in the last several decades the evaluation of anecdotes has received sustained academic scrutiny from economists and scholars such as Felix Salmon, S. G. Checkland (on David Ricardo), Steven Novella, R. Charleton, Hollis Robbins, Kwamena Kwansah-Aidoo, and others. These academics seek to quantify the value of the use of anecdotes, e.g. in promoting public awareness of a disease. More recently, economists studying choice models have begun assessing anecdotal value in the context of framing; Daniel Kahneman and Amos Tversky suggest that choice models may be contingent on stories or anecdotes that frame or influence choice. As an example, consider the quote, widely misattributed to Joseph Stalin: "The death of one man is a tragedy, the death of millions is a statistic."

== See also ==
- Allais paradox
- Availability heuristic
- Informational cascade
