= Alex Zhavoronkov =

Latvian-born AI and longevity researcher

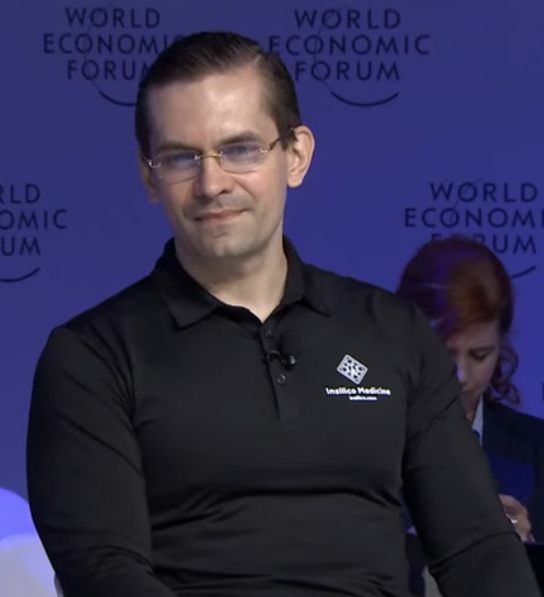
- At a WEF meeting in June 2024
- Born: Riga, Latvia
- Education: Queen's University at Kingston; Johns Hopkins University (JHU)
- Known for: The Ageless Generation: How Advances in Biomedicine Will Transform the Global Economy
- Scientific career
- Fields: aging, regenerative medicine, drug development, artificial intelligence
- Workplaces: Insilico Medicine, Biogerontology Research Foundation

Alex Zhavoronkov (born Aleksandrs Zavoronkovs) is a Latvian-born scientist and author working in biotechnology, regenerative medicine, and aging economics. He is the founder and CEO of Insilico Medicine, and, as of 2024, is the director of the Biogerontology Research Foundation, a UK-based think-tank for aging research. Zhavoronkov has published a substantial number of papers, and books including The Ageless Generation: How Advances in Biomedicine Will Transform the Global Economy.

== Biography ==
=== Early life, education, and career ===
Born in Latvia, Zhavoronkov received two bachelor's degrees from Queen's University, and worked in graphics processing before moving to the biotechnology field. He received a master's degree in biotechnology from Johns Hopkins University, and a PhD in physics and mathematics from Moscow State University. In the mid-2010s, he was an adjunct professor at the Moscow Institute of Physics and Technology. As of 2024, he was an adjunct professor of artificial intelligence at the Buck Institute for Research on Aging. Zhavoronkov was named as a co-inventor on a patent issued in May 2013 for "systems and methods for communicating with a computer using brain activity patterns".

=== AI and medical research ===
In 2014, Zhavoronkov began work towards using "massive data sets and Al to significantly speed up the drug discovery process", and established Insilico at Johns Hopkins University in Baltimore. Tony Robbins and Peter Diamandis were early investors in Zhavoronkov's efforts. Robbins wrote of Zhavoronkov that "researchers had been using GANs to do things like design new objects or create one-of-a-kind, fake human faces, but Zhavoronkov wanted to apply them to pharmacology".

In November 2017, Zhavoronkov proposed the application of the deep learning techniques and blockchain technology for managing human life data.

In 2022, Zhavoronkov participated in a round of financing for Insilico Medicine that raised $60 million for the venture. Zhavoronkov asserted at the time that the industry was "in 'biotechnology winter' where many companies are running out of cash and are dying", and that his fundraising was positioning the company for a coming "biotech spring". AI writer Calum Chace described Zhavoronkov at the time as well known within the longevity community "for his relentless focus". In February 2023, Wesley J. Smith, writing for National Review, sharply criticized comments by Zhavoronkov, who had observed that organ transplants used to facilitate life extension could someday be provided by using human clones generated without cognitive functions.

In June 2023, Zhavoronkov led Insilico's development of what he described as "the first fully generative AI drug to reach human clinical trials, and specifically Phase II trials with patients". In 2024, he moved the headquarters of the company to Boston, Massachusetts.

=== Other AI and internet activities ===
In 2016, Zhavoronkov was the chief science officer for Beauty.AI, an artificial intelligence technology that evaluate people's external appearance through certain algorithms. In this role, he responded to concerns about ethnic bias in results generated by the platform by attributing them to a lack of data provided to it.

In 2022, Zhavoronkov was an author of a paper titled Rapamycin in the context of Pascal's Wager: generative pre-trained transformer perspective, which was described as one of the first peer-reviewed published papers to formally credit ChatGPT as a coauthor. Zhavoronkov reported that when he asked ChatGPT itself whether it should be named as a coauthor, "it responded with multiple compelling reasons as to why it should not".

In May 2024, Zhavoronkov was noted to have funded production of a realistically animated rendition of a head transplant, with the face of the transplant subject being recognized as Zhavoronkov's own. This became a viral video on social media.

== Publications ==
Since 2010, Zhavoronkov has authored or co-authored over 250 scientific articles published in refereed journals and referenced in PubMed.

Books

- Moskalev, Alexey; Stambler, Ilia; Zhavoronkov, Alex (2023), Artificial Intelligence for Healthy Longevity, Springer, ASIN B0C6CS2XJ3
- Zhavoronkov, Alex (2013). The Ageless Generation: How Advances in Biomedicine Will Transform the Global Economy. Macmillan. ISBN 978-0-230-34220-0.
- Zhavoronkov, Alex (2012), Dating A.I.: A guide to falling in love with Artificial Intelligence, RE/Search Publications, ISBN 978-1-889307-35-0

Articles

- Zhavoronkov, A., et al., "Potential non-covalent SARS-CoV-2 3C-like protease inhibitors designed using generative deep learning approaches and reviewed by human medicinal chemist in virtual reality", ChemRxiv (2020), DOI: 10.26434/chemrxiv.12301457.v1 (note: multiple versions).
- Zhavoronkov, A., et al., "Deep learning enables rapid identification of potent DDR1 kinase inhibitors", Nature Biotechnology 37 (9) (2019), p. 1038-1040.
- P. Mamoshina, A. Vieira, E. Putin, A. Zhavoronkov (2016). "Applications of deep learning in biomedicine". Molecular Pharmaceutics. 13 (5): 1445–1454. doi:10.1021/acs.molpharmaceut.5b00982. PMID 27007977.
