= Cognitive-experiential self-theory =

Dual-process model of perception

Cognitive-experiential self-theory (CEST) is a dual-process model of perception developed by Seymour Epstein. CEST is based around the idea that people operate using two separate systems for information processing: analytical-rational and intuitive-experiential. The analytical-rational system is deliberate, slow, and logical. The intuitive-experiential system is fast, automatic, and emotionally driven. These are independent systems that operate in parallel and interact to produce behavior and conscious thought.

There have been other dual-process theories in the past. Shelly Chaiken's heuristic-systematic model, Carl Jung's distinction between thinking and feeling, and John Bargh's theory on automatic vs. non-automatic processing all have similar components to CEST. However, Epstein's cognitive-experiential self-theory is unique in that it places a dual-process model within the context of a global theory of personality, rather than considering it as an isolated construct or cognitive shortcut. Epstein argues that within the context of day-to-day life, a constant interaction occurs between the two systems. Because the experiential system is fast, guided by emotion and past experience, and requires little in terms of cognitive resources, it is especially equipped to handle the majority of information processing on a daily basis, all of which occurs outside of conscious awareness. This, in turn, allows us to focus the limited capacity of our rational system on whatever requires our conscious attention at the time.

Individual differences in preference for analytical or experiential processing can be measured using the Rational Experiential Inventory (REI). The REI measures the two independent processing modes with two factors: need for cognition (rational measure) and faith in intuition (experiential measure). Several studies have confirmed that the REI is a reliable measure of individual differences in information processing, and that the two independent thinking styles measured account for a substantial amount of variance that is not addressed by other personality theories such as the five factor model.

== Analytical-rational system ==
The analytical-rational system is that of conscious thought. It is slow, logical, and a much more recent evolutionary development. The rational system is what allows us to engage in many of the behaviors that we consider to be uniquely human, such as abstract thought and the use of language. It is an inferential system that operates through reason and demands large amounts of cognitive resources. As a result, the rational system has a limited capacity. This system is emotionless and can be changed relatively easily through appeals of logic and reason.

The rational system is unique because of its awareness and capacity for conscious control. Unlike the experiential system, which is unaware and independent of the rational system, the rational system is capable of understanding and correcting for the operation of the experiential system. That is not to say that the rational system is capable of suppressing the experiential system, but it does mean that the rational system can, with conscious effort, decide to accept or reject influence from the experiential system. As a result, even individuals who are prone to experiential processing are capable of discounting its influence when they consciously decide to do so. The analytical-rational factor yielded from the REI is called need for cognition (NFC). Research has been done addressing the question of sub-factors, but NFC has retained its coherence in factor analyses suggesting that sub-factors cannot be reliably extracted. However, others have suggested that ability and engagement sub-scales can be applied to both the rational and experiential systems.

== Intuitive-experiential system ==
The intuitive-experiential system is a preconscious learning system that humans likely share with other higher-order animals as it is a much older evolutionary development. It is fast, automatic, holistic, and intimately associated with affect or emotion. Change occurs within the system through three forms of associative learning: classical conditioning, operant conditioning, and observational learning. Learning often occurs slowly in this system through reinforcement and repetition, but once change has occurred, it is often highly stable and resistant to invalidation.

Recent research has identified three reliable facets of intuitive-experiential processing: intuition, imagination, and emotionality. Intuition is most closely associated with the system as a whole, as this facet addresses the experiential system's capability of making associations and affective judgments outside of awareness. Within the intuitive-experiential system, imagining an experience can have cognitive and behavioral effects similar to experience itself. In this way, imagination also plays a primary role in the experiential system, which learns primarily through experience. Emotion is the third facet of the intuitive-experiential system. It may be that emotion is the most fundamental component; without it, the experiential system would not exist at all. Emotional reinforcement is necessary for associative learning to occur. Emotions also affect what experiences are attended to based on the reinforcement history of the experiential system, as well as our motivations to approach or avoid particular experiences. It has also been shown that emotional involvement in experience affects the relative influence of the experiential system. That is, as emotionality goes up, so too does the importance and influence of the experiential system.

== Comparison of rational and experiential systems ==
Rational System	Experiential System
Analytic	Holistic
Intentional	Automatic
Rational	Emotional
Mediates behavior by conscious appraisal	Mediates behavior through "feel"
Slow for delayed action	Fast for immediate action
Easily changed through reason	Resistant to change
Conscious	Preconscious

== Individual differences in thinking styles ==
Individual differences, within the context of CEST, can be assessed in a couple of different ways. First, if rational and experiential processes are independent systems for processing information, then one would suspect that there are individual differences in how effectively we use those systems. That is, each person should have an intelligence level for each of the two systems. Rational intelligence can be measured easily enough with simple IQ tests, which naturally assess many aspects of the rational system. However, IQ tests do not assess any of the primary aspects of the experiential system. To address this issue, the Constructive Thinking Inventory (CTI) was developed to measure individual differences in efficacy of the experiential system. Consistent with the assumption of independence, studies have shown no correlation between IQ measures and CTI scores.

Individual differences in preference for one system over the other is another meaningful personality variable that can be assumed. The Rational-Experiential Inventory (REI) and the later Rational/Experiential Multimodal Inventory (REIm) were developed to test that assumption. Indeed, reliable individual differences in preference for thinking styles consistently emerge from studies that use these assessments. What's more, individual differences in preference for a particular thinking style, as assessed by the REI, have been associated with a number of meaningful life outcomes. A preference for rational thought shows a number of beneficial associations. Increased academic achievement (GRE scores and grade-point average), self-esteem, openness to experience, and conscientiousness and decreased levels of depression and state-trait anxiety have all been associated with need for cognition. Higher levels of Faith in Intuition have more mixed results. Creativity, spontaneity, emotional expression, agreeableness, extroversion, and positive interpersonal relationships have all been associated with a preference for experiential processing. However, it has also been linked with authoritarianism, superstitious beliefs, and stereotypical thinking.

Sex and age differences in thinking styles have also been found. Research has consistently found that women tend to rely more on experiential processing whereas men seem to be more prone to the rational system. Research also suggests that our preference processing style likely changes with age. Specifically, as age increases, preference for Faith in Intuition decreases. However, no relationship between age and need for cognition has been found.

== Interactions of the experiential and rational systems ==
According to CEST, behavior is the result of an interaction between the rational and emotive processing systems. Both systems have their own adaptations, and thus their own strengths and weaknesses. The experiential system can quickly and efficiently direct most behavior in everyday life. However, it is primarily influenced by emotion and, as a result of its concrete and associative nature, it is poor at dealing with abstract concepts. The rational system directs behavior through logical principles. Therefore, it is well equipped to correct the experiential system. The rational system is slow, however, and it requires a large amount of cognitive resources.

With these points in mind, the two systems work best in tandem. The interaction between systems can occur either sequentially or simultaneously, with each system affecting the other. Normal operation of the systems is as follows: An individual is presented with an event, the experiential system makes automatic associative connections to other events or experiences within the same schema, and an emotional response or "vibe" is elicited for the event as a whole. This emotional response then directs behavior. This process, from presentation of event to emotional response occurs in an instant, automatically, and outside of awareness. That is not to say that we are unaware of the emotional response. Indeed, we do experience the “vibe” resulting from this process, and the rational system often tries to understand, or rationalize behavior. Rationalization, or the process of finding a rational explanation for experientially driven behavior, occurs more often than is generally recognized. Through the process of rationalization we naturally select the most emotionally satisfying explanation for our behavior, so long as it does not too seriously violate our understanding of reality. This emotional influence of the experiential system on the rational system, and the rational system's resulting rationalization process, is, according to CEST, the primary cause of human irrationality.

The rational system is also capable of having an effect on the experiential system. As the rational system is slower, it is in a position to correct the emotionally-driven automatic response of the experiential system. It is this ability that allows us to consciously control our automatic responses and have capabilities such as deferred gratification. Repetition of conscious behavior can also cause the rational system to have an effect on the experiential system. When a conscious behavior is repeated often enough, it can become proceduralized, and move into the experiential system. Evidence for this can be seen in the finding that high Faith in Intuition is associated with higher observed hand hygiene compliance rates among doctors.

== Importance and implications ==
Cognitive-experiential self-theory is not the first multiple-processing theory. Freud distinguished between primary process and secondary process, and Pavlov proposed first and second signaling systems. More recently, Amos Tversky and Daniel Kahneman introduced the idea of heuristics, and concluded that there are natural and extensional forms of reasoning. However, CEST differs from past dual-processing models in a number of important ways. First, CEST presents the idea of an adaptive unconscious. That is, a major assumption of CEST is that the experiential system was evolutionarily developed because it was adaptive by nature, and, for the most part, it remains adaptive. This is a major departure from many past theories which tend to focus on the maladaptive nature of unconscious processing. The CEST is also unique because it brings together components that, in the context of other theories, are unrelated constructs; the CEST unifies them into one organized adaptive system. By doing so, CEST presents a more holistic cognitive personality theory.

There are also a number of important research applications associated with CEST. For example, human irrationality has consistently been a major area of focus in cognitive research. CEST argues that by gaining an understanding of our rational and experiential systems, and how they interact, we can gain insight into how these primarily adaptive systems can in some cases lead to maladaptive behavior. There are also clinical applications of CEST. Cognitive therapists commonly encourage individuals to appeal to their rational system to dispute maladaptive thoughts. Further research on individual differences in processing styles of a clinical sample could provide insight into how best to diagnose and treat psychopathologies.

== See also ==
- Differential psychology
