= The death of one man is a tragedy, the death of millions is a statistic =

Phrase misattributed to Joseph Stalin

"The death of one man is a tragedy, the death of millions is a statistic" (Note: Alternatively rendered as: One death is a tragedy. A million deaths is just a statistic.; A single death is a tragedy; a million deaths is a statistic.; When one dies, it is a tragedy. When a million die, it is a statistic.) is a phrase widely misattributed to Joseph Stalin.

== History ==
This phrase probably originated in France after World War I. The March 6, 1924, edition of the French satirical newspaper Comic-Finance published what may be the earliest version of the quote as part of a likely-fictional anecdote in which a diplomat from the Quai d'Orsay (a metonym for the French Ministry of Foreign Affairs) quips about the tragedies of war:

War? It's not that terrible! The death of one man is, indeed, a terrible thing, but one hundred thousand deaths is a statistic. (La guerre ? Ce n'est pas si terrible ! La mort d'un homme est, en effet, chose épouvantable : mais cent mille morts, c'est une statistique.)

This saying was reused without attribution in newspaper columns by J.-Wladimir Bienstock and Curnonsky in April 1924 and (in German) by Kurt Tucholsky in 1925 and later reprinted in anthologies of their writing.

It was probably attributed to Joseph Stalin for the first time on January 30, 1947, in an article by the columnist Leonard Lyons in the Washington Post, in which he wrote, without evidence, that in 1933, Stalin said this regarding the victims of the Holodomor:

If only one man dies of hunger, that is a tragedy. If millions die, that’s only statistics.

In the 1981 publication The Time of Stalin: Portrait of Tyranny, (Note: Russian: Портрет тирана) Soviet historian Anton Antonov-Ovseyenko alleges that, during the 1943 Tehran conference when Winston Churchill objected to an early opening of a second front in France, Stalin responded:

When one man dies it's a tragedy. When thousands die it's statistics.

In her review "Mustering Most Memorable Quips" of Konstantin Dushenko's 1997 Dictionary of Modern Quotations, (Note: Russian: Словарь современных цитат: 4300 ходячих цитат и выражений ХХ века, их источники, авторы, датировка) Julia Solovyova states:

Russian historians have no record of the lines, 'Death of one man is a tragedy. Death of a million is a statistic,' commonly attributed by English-language dictionaries to Josef Stalin.

Mary Soames, the daughter of Winston Churchill, claims to have overheard Stalin deliver a variant of the saying while meeting with her father during the Potsdam Conference in July 1945. Churchill was upset over news he had received over the death of a family friend, and said to Stalin, "Oh, you must forgive me because when I think of the terrible losses your armies are suffering, and here am I upset by this news." Stalin is said to have replied:

Oh no, the death of one man is always a tragedy. The death of thousands is a matter of statistics.

In an interview given for the 1983 three-part documentary Der Prozeß by Norddeutscher Rundfunk on the Third Majdanek trial, Simon Wiesenthal attributes the quote to the unpublished autobiography of Adolf Eichmann. According to Wiesenthal, Eichmann had been asked by another member of the Reich Main Security Office during World War II what they should say if they are questioned after the war about the millions of dead Jews that they were responsible for. Eichmann, according to his own testimony, had replied with the saying.

== See also ==
- Anecdotal value
- Identifiable victim effect
- Jean Rostand, famous for the quotation "Kill one man, and you are a murderer. Kill millions of men, and you are a conqueror. Kill them all, and you are a God."
- Monsieur Verdoux, a film about a serial killer also remarkable for the quote "One murder makes a villain; millions a hero. Numbers sanctify."
