= Distress tolerance =

Construct in psychology

Distress tolerance is an emerging construct in psychology that has been conceptualized in several different ways. Broadly, however, it refers to an individual's "perceived capacity to withstand negative emotional and/or other aversive states (e.g. physical discomfort), and the behavioral act of withstanding distressing internal states elicited by some type of stressor." Some definitions of distress tolerance have also specified that the endurance of these negative events occur in contexts in which methods to escape the distressor exist.

== Tolerated illness ==
A tolerated illness is a "noted discordance between subjective and objective health measures" in a patient. Native American communities have been shown to have a high incidence of illness tolerance, in part because of the treatment they receive in the healthcare system.

The immune system of plants has been shown to protect against pathogens through a strategy of tolerance. This defense "decreases the host susceptibility to tissue damage, or other fitness costs, caused by the pathogens or by the immune response against them".

== Measurement ==
In the literature, differences in conceptualizations of distress tolerance have corresponded with two methods of assessing this construct.

As self-report inventories fundamentally assess an individual's perceptions and reflections on constructs related to the self, self-report measures of distress tolerance (i.e., questionnaires) specifically focus on the perceived ability to endure distressful states, broadly defined. Some questionnaires focus specifically on emotional distress tolerance (e.g. the distress tolerance scale), others on distress tolerance of negative physical states (e.g. discomfort intolerance scale), and yet others focus specifically on tolerance of frustration as an overarching process of distress tolerance (e.g. frustration-discomfort scale).

In contrast, studies that incorporate behavioral or biobehavioral assessments of distress tolerance provide information about real behavior rather than individuals' perceptions. Examples of stress-inducing tasks include those that require the individual to persist in tracing a computerized mirror under timed conditions (i.e., computerized mirror tracing persistence task) or complete a series of time-sensitive math problems for which incorrect answers produce an aversive noise (i.e., computerized paced auditory serial addition task). Some behavioral tasks are conceptualized to assess physical distress tolerance, and require individuals to hold their breath for as long as possible (breath-holding task).

As this is a nascent field of research, the relationships between perceptual and behavioral assessments of distress tolerance remain unclear. Disentangling distinct components of emotional/psychological distress tolerance and physical distress tolerance within behavioral tasks also remains a challenge in the literature.

== Theoretical structures ==
Several models about the structural hierarchy of distress tolerance have been proposed. Some work suggests that physical and psychological tolerance are distinct constructs. Specifically, sensitivity to feelings of anxiety and tolerance of negative emotional states may be related to each other as aspects of a larger construct representing sensitivity and tolerance of affect broadly; discomfort surrounding physical stressors, however, was found to be an entirely separate construct not associated with sensitivity to emotional states. Notably, this preliminary work was conducted with self-report measures, and findings are cross-sectional in nature. The authors advise that additional longitudinal work is necessary to corroborate these relationships and elucidate the direction of causality.

Recent work extends the distinction between emotional and physical distress tolerance into a higher-order construct, global experiential distress tolerance. This framework draws upon tolerance constructs that have been historically studied as distinct from distress tolerance. The five following constructs are framed as lower-order factors for the global distress tolerance construct, and include:

- Tolerance of uncertainty, or "the tendency to react emotionally, cognitively, or behaviorally to uncertain situations"
- Tolerance of ambiguity, or "the perceived tolerance of complicated, foreign, and/or vague situations of stimuli"
- Tolerance of frustration, or "the perceived capacity to withstand aggravation (e.g., thwarted life goals)"
- Tolerance of negative emotional states, or "the perceived capacity to withstand internal distress"
- Tolerance of physical sensations, or "the perceived capacity to withstand uncomfortable physical sensations"

Within models that conceptualize distress tolerance solely as the ability to endure negative emotional states, it is hypothesized to be multidimensional. This includes individual processes related to the anticipation of and experience with negative emotions, such as perceived and actual ability to tolerate the negative emotion, the appraisal of a given situation as acceptable or not, the degree to which an individual can regulate their emotion in the midst of a negative emotional experience, and the amount of attention dedicated to processing the negative emotion.

== Biological bases ==
There are several candidate biological neural network mechanisms for distress tolerance. These proposed brain areas are based on the conceptualization of distress tolerance as a function of reward learning. Within this framework, individuals learn to attune to and pursue reward; reduction of tension in escaping from a stressor is similarly framed as a reward and thus can be learned. Individuals differ in how quickly and for how long they display preferences for pursuing reward or, in the case of distress tolerance, escaping from a distressful stimulus. Therefore, brain regions that are activated during reward processing and learning are hypothesized to also serve as neurobiological substrates for distress tolerance. For instance, activation intensity of dopamine neurons projecting to the nucleus accumbens, ventral striatum, and prefrontal cortex is associated with an individual's predicted value of an immediate reward during a learning task. As the firing rate for these neurons increases, individuals predict high values of an immediate reward. During instances in which the predicted value is correct, the basal rate of neuronal firing remains the same. When the predicted reward value is lower than the actual value, neuronal firing rates increase upon receipt of the reward, leading to a learned response. When the expected reward value is below the actual value, the firing rate of these neurons decreases below baseline levels, resulting in a learned shift that reduces expectancies about reward value. It is posited that these same dopaminergic firing rates are associated with distress tolerance, in that learning the value of escaping a distressing stimulus is analogous to an estimation of an immediate reward. There are several potential clinical implications if these posited distress tolerance substrates are corroborated. It may suggest that distress tolerance is malleable among individuals; interventions that change neuronal firing rates may shift predicted values of behaviors intended to escape a distressor and provide relief, thereby increasing distress tolerance.

Other neural areas may be implicated in moderating this reward learning process. Excitability of inhibitory medium spiny neurons in the nucleus accumbens and ventral striatum have been found to moderate the association between the value of an immediate reward and probability of pursuing reward or relief. Within rats, it has been demonstrated that increasing the excitability of these neurons via increased CREB expression resulted in an increased amount of time that the rats would keep their tail still when a noxious thermal paste was applied, as well as an increased amount of time spent in the open arms of a complex maze; these behaviors have been conceptualized as analogous distress tolerance in response to pain and anxiety.

== Associations with psychopathology ==
Distress tolerance is an emerging research topic in clinical psychology because it has been posited to contribute to the development and maintenance of several types of mental disorders, including mood and anxiety disorders such as major depressive disorder and generalized anxiety disorder, substance use and addiction, and personality disorders. In general, research on distress tolerance have found associations with these disorders that are tied closely to specific conceptualizations of distress tolerance. For instance, Borderline Personality Disorder is posited to be maintained through a chronic unwillingness to engage in or tolerate emotionally distressful states. Similarly, susceptibility to developing anxiety disorders is often characterized by low emotional distress tolerance. Low distress tolerance of both physical and emotional states is perceived to be a risk factor in maintaining and escalating addiction. Distress tolerance is particularly important in neurobiological theories that posit that advanced stages of addiction are driven by use of a substance to avoid physical and psychological withdrawal symptoms.

As a result of this interest in distress tolerance and its relationship with clinical psychopathology, several psychosocial treatments have been developed to improve distress tolerance among populations that are traditionally resistant to treatment. Many of these interventions (e.g. acceptance-based emotion regulation therapy) aim to boost distress tolerance by increasing the willingness to engage with emotion and meta-skills of acceptance of emotional conflict. Other behavioral interventions include components of building distress tolerance for various treatment targets, including acceptance and commitment therapy, dialectical behavior therapy, functional analytic psychotherapy, integrative behavioral couples therapy, and mindfulness-based cognitive therapy. Multiple studies suggest that such distress tolerance interventions may be effective in treating generalized anxiety disorder, depression, and borderline personality disorder.

== Therapy approaches to improving distress tolerance ==
Dialectical behavior therapy (DBT) and Acceptance and commitment therapy (ACT) are therapy approaches which include specific focus on distress tolerance.
