= Questionable cause =

Logical fallacy

The questionable cause—also known as causal fallacy, false cause, or non causa pro causa ("non-cause for cause" in Latin)—is a category of informal fallacies in which the cause or causes is/are incorrectly identified. In other words, it is a fallacy of reaching a conclusion that one thing caused another, simply because they are regularly associated.

Questionable cause can be logically reduced to: "A is regularly associated with B; therefore, A causes B."

For example: "Every time I score an A on the test it's a sunny day. Therefore the sunny day causes me to score well on the test." Here is the example the two events may coincide or correlate, but have no causal connection.

Fallacies of questionable cause include:

- Circular cause and consequence
- Correlation implies causation (cum hoc, ergo propter hoc)
  - Third-cause fallacy
  - Wrong direction
- Fallacy of the single cause
- Post hoc ergo propter hoc
- Observational interpretation fallacy
- Regression fallacy
- Texas sharpshooter fallacy
- Jumping to conclusions
- Association fallacy
- Magical thinking
