= Underplay =

Underplay may refer to:

- Underplay, a term associated with Minimisation in psychology
- Underplay (cards), to follow suit with a lower card
