= Anthony Trimingham =

English public health activist

- Born: 1948 (age 77–78)
- Occupation: Family Drug Support CEO
- Spouse: Sandra

Anthony Trimingham (born 1948) is an English-born Australian public health activist. he worked as a relationship counsellor and a group leader for over 30 years. After his son died from a heroin drug overdose, Trimingham founded the Australian charity Family Drug Support in 1997 and named the Damien Trimingham Foundation for his son. Trimingham is also the vice president and co-founder of Harm Reduction Australia and is an advocate of drug law reform and harm reduction.

== Early life ==
Trimingham was born in England in 1948, one of three children to parents Ivy and Charlie. His interests during his childhood included ancient medieval history, philosophy and debating. He moved to Australia at the age of 20.

== Career ==
After his son Damien died, Trimingham began community work in relation to alcohol and other drugs and founded the charity Family Drug Support (FDS). He was awarded a Medal of the Order of Australia in 2005 for his community work in the field of drugs and alcohol. Trimingham has brought about International Family Drug Support Day which commenced in 2016 and is held on 24 February. Trimingham's wife, Sandra, also works at FDS and manages the 24/7 family support line.

== Personal life ==
Trimingham married Sandra in 2007 and has three children.

== Philosophical and/or political views ==
Trimingham's son, Damien, was interested in history, music, sport and philosophy and was particularly fascinated by Dionysus. Trimingham's opinions about harm minimisation are clearly expressed in his interviews. and writings. He believes and advocates for Drug Law Reform for Australia, and the decriminalisation of drugs in aid of harm minimisation of drug use and related consequences. Trimingham values family support services in aid of reducing the sense of stigma and shame that families experience when a family member is involved in alcohol and drug misuse and achieving better outcomes for families affected by problematic drug use. He advocates for the introduction of evidence based policies and programs that reduce the likelihood of harm for people using drugs—this includes safe injection facilities, prescription heroin programs and pill testing services. Trimingham advocates for a significant increase in funding for family support, access to education, prevention, treatment and harm reduction services.

== Published works ==
- Trimingham, Tony (2009). Not My Family, Never My Child: what to do if someone you love is a drug user. Sydney: Allen & Unwin. ISBN 978-1-74175-525-1
- Trimingham, Tony & Ravesi, Antonia (2000). Stepping Stones Workbook: Guiding Families Through the Journey of Coping with Drug and Alcohol Use. Melbourne: ADF. ISBN 978-0-85809-100-9

== Honours, decorations, awards and distinctions ==
In 1998, Trimingham was appointed a founding member of the Australian National Council on Drugs by John Howard. In 1999 he was awarded by the Alcohol and Other Drugs Council of Australia an Australia Day Medallion for outstanding achievement.

Trimingham was awarded The National Rolleston Award by the International Harm Reduction Association in relation to Trimingham's excellence in supporting families, and on the Honour Roll for the National Drug & Alcohol awards in 2004.

In 2005, he was honoured with a Medal of the Order of Australia award, and received the Australian Humanitarian award.

In 2008, he was the joint winner of the Prime Minister's Award for work in the field of drugs and alcohol.

In 2009, Trimingham was a finalist in the NSW Senior Australian of the Year award.

In 2016, he won the Outstanding Contribution from NSW Non-Government Alcohol & Other Drugs award.
