= Spurious correlation of ratios =

Concept in statistics

An illustration of spurious correlation, this figure shows 500 observations of x/z plotted against y/z. The sample correlation is 0.53, even though x, y, and z are statistically independent of each other (i.e., the pairwise correlations between each of them are zero). The z-values are highlighted on a colour scale.

In statistics, spurious correlation of ratios is a form of spurious correlation that arises between ratios of absolute measurements which themselves are uncorrelated.

The phenomenon of spurious correlation of ratios is one of the main motives for the field of compositional data analysis, which deals with the analysis of variables that carry only relative information, such as proportions, percentages and parts-per-million.

Spurious correlation is distinct from misconceptions about correlation and causality.

== Illustration of spurious correlation ==
Pearson states a simple example of spurious correlation:

Select three numbers within certain ranges at random, say x, y, z, these will be pair and pair uncorrelated. Form the proper fractions x/z and y/z for each triplet, and correlation will be found between these indices.

The scatter plot above illustrates this example using 500 observations of x, y, and z. Variables x, y and z are drawn from normal distributions with means 10, 10, and 30, respectively, and standard deviations 1, 1, and 3 respectively, i.e.,

$$\begin{align}
x,y & \sim N(10,1) \\
z & \sim N(30,3)  \\
\end{align}$$

Even though x, y, and z are statistically independent and therefore uncorrelated, in the depicted typical sample the ratios x/z and y/z have a correlation of 0.53. This is because of the common divisor (z) and can be better understood if we colour the points in the scatter plot by the z-value. Trios of (x, y, z) with relatively large z values tend to appear in the bottom left of the plot; trios with relatively small z values tend to appear in the top right.

== Approximate amount of spurious correlation ==
Pearson derived an approximation of the correlation that would be observed between two indices ($x_1/x_3$ and $x_2/x_4$), i.e., ratios of the absolute measurements $x_1, x_2, x_3, x_4$:

$$\rho = \frac{r_{12} v_1 v_2 - r_{14} v_1 v_4 - r_{23} v_2 v_3 + r_{34} v_3 v_4}{\sqrt{v_1^2 +  v_3^2 - 2 r_{13} v_1 v_3} \sqrt{v_2^2 +  v_4^2 - 2 r_{24} v_2 v_4}}$$

where $v_i$ is the coefficient of variation of $x_i$, and $r_{ij}$ the Pearson correlation between $x_i$ and $x_j$.

This expression can be simplified for situations where there is a common divisor by setting $x_3=x_4$, and $x_1, x_2, x_3$ are uncorrelated, giving the spurious correlation:

$$\rho_0 = \frac{v_3^2}{\sqrt{v_1^2 +  v_3^2} \sqrt{v_2^2 +  v_3^2}}.$$

For the special case in which all coefficients of variation are equal (as is the case in the illustrations at right), $\rho_0 = 0.5$

== Relevance to biology and other sciences ==
Pearson was joined by Sir Francis Galton and Walter Frank Raphael Weldon in cautioning scientists to be wary of spurious correlation, especially in biology where it is common to scale or normalize measurements by dividing them by a particular variable or total. The danger he saw was that conclusions would be drawn from correlations that are artifacts of the analysis method, rather than actual "organic" relationships.

However, it would appear that spurious correlation (and its potential to mislead) is not yet widely understood. In 1986 John Aitchison, who pioneered the log-ratio approach to compositional data analysis wrote:

It seems surprising that the warnings of three such eminent statistician-scientists as Pearson, Galton and Weldon should have largely gone unheeded for so long: even today uncritical applications of inappropriate statistical methods to compositional data with consequent dubious inferences are regularly reported.

More recent publications suggest that this lack of awareness prevails, at least in molecular bioscience.
