= Demonizing the enemy =

Propaganda technique

Demonizing the enemy or demonization of the enemy is a propaganda technique which promotes an idea about the enemy being a threatening, evil aggressor with only destructive objectives. Demonization aims to inspire hatred toward an enemy, rendering the enemy more easily hurt while preserving and mobilizing allies and demoralizing the enemy.

== Basic criteria ==
Because of the frequent misuse of the term demonization, it is deprived of its potential to be analyzed. That is why Jules Boykoff defined four criteria of enemy demonization:

1. Both media and state employ frames to portray inherent nature of so-called enemy mostly in moral terms.
2. The character of the opponent is depicted in a Manichean way, as good against evil.
3. The state is the origin of such demonological portraying.
4. There is no significant counterclaim from the state.

== History ==
The demonization of the enemy has been routinely conducted throughout the history. Thucydides recorded examples in Ancient Greece.

Phillip Knightley believed that demonization of the enemy (first enemy leaders and later enemy individuals) became a predictable pattern followed by Western media, the final stage being atrocities.

During the Second World War, propaganda documentaries that contained enemy demonization and flag-waving patriotism were prepared by the US State Department and other state institutions of the United States and distributed, after being approved.

== Personification and demonization ==
Demonization of the enemy can be much easier to conduct if the enemy is personalized in one man, such as Kaiser Wilhelm II, who was demonized by the Russian popular media during the First World War.

== Consequences ==
I hold it to a sign of great prudence in men to refrain alike from threats and from the use of insulting language, for neither of these things deprives the enemy of his power, but the first puts him more on his guard, while the other intensifies his hatred of you and makes him more industrious in devising means to harm you.

— Niccolò Machiavelli

The strategy of demonization of the enemy unavoidably leads to a vicious cycle of atrocities, which was elaborated by many authors including Carl von Clausewitz. Demonization of the enemy makes diplomatic solutions impossible and inevitably leads to war or worsening of relations. Depicting the enemy as particularly evil inspires feelings that make killings more easy.

The portrayal of one's enemy as demonic has often led to the treatment of the whole population or political apparatus associated with the enemy group or leader as equally demonic. This also often results in a tendency to reduce an enemy's more complex motives to simple promotion of pure evil.

The Chinese revolutionary theorist Mao Zedong held that the demonization of oneself by the enemy was a good thing. He said, "It is still better if the enemy attacks us wildly and paints us as utterly black and without a single virtue; it demonstrates that we have not only drawn a clear line of demarcation between the enemy and ourselves but achieved a great deal in our work." (To Be Attacked by the Enemy Is Not a Bad Thing but a Good Thing (May 26, 1939))

== See also ==
- Ole Holsti: Inherent bad faith model
- Psychological warfare
- Psychological operations (United States)
