= Misdirection =

Misdirection may refer to:

- Misdirection (magic), a technique used when performing magic tricks
- Misdirection, a technique used for the purpose of pickpocketing
- Misdirection (pickleball), a deceptive strategy when hitting the ball
- Misdirection, a comedic device involving misleading the audience
- Counter trey, a technique used in American Football
- Feint, a technique used in strategy games and warfare
- Limited hangout, a technique used by the intelligence services
- Psychobabble and technobabble, techniques used in fast talk
- "Misdirection" (Inside No. 9), a television episode
