= Observational interpretation fallacy =

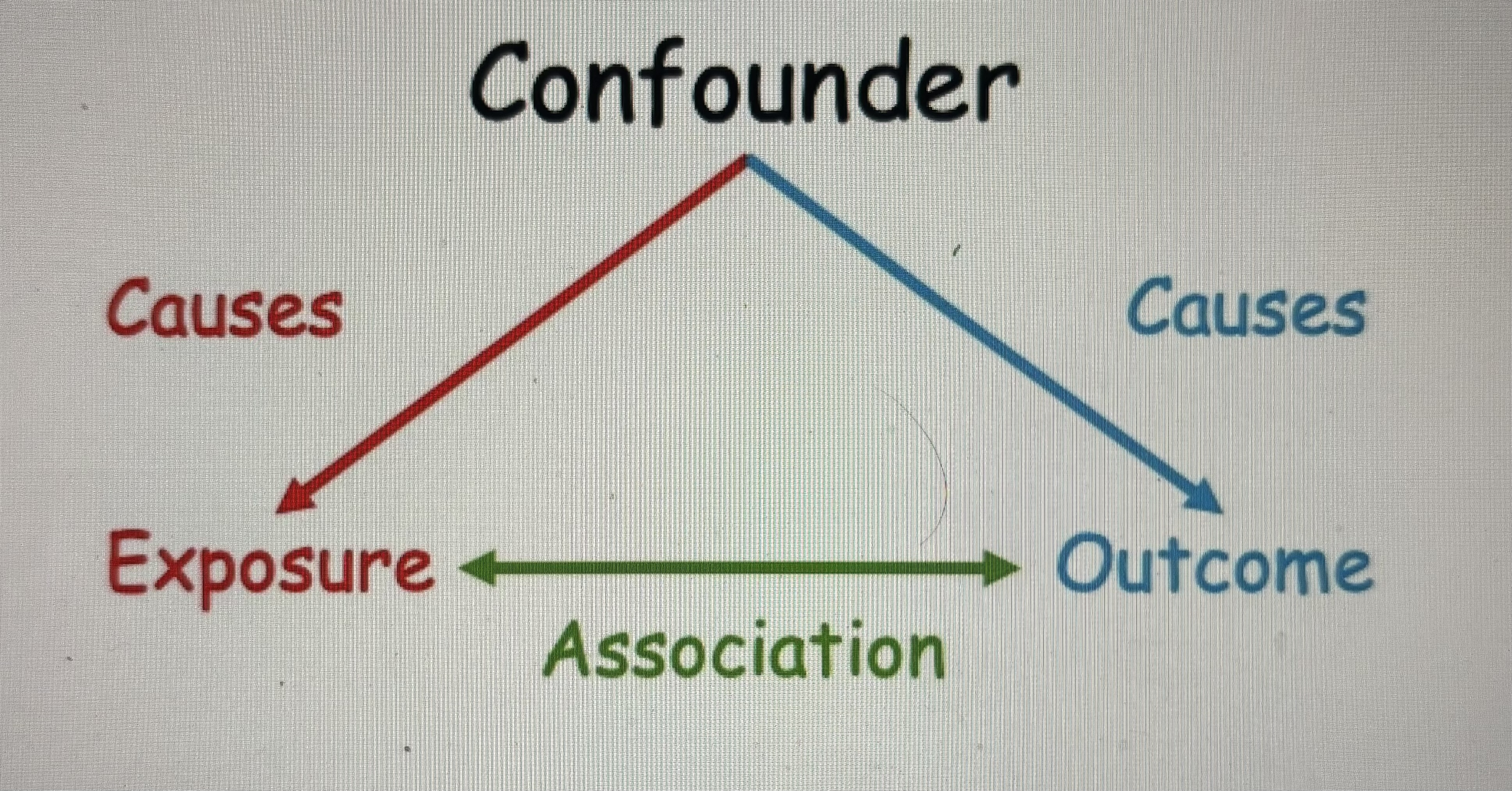

The observational interpretation fallacy is the cognitive bias where associations identified in observational studies are misinterpreted as causal relationships. This misinterpretation often influences clinical guidelines, public health policies, and medical practices, sometimes to the detriment of patient safety and resource allocation.

The term was introduced in a 2024 study published in the Journal of Evaluation in Clinical Practice. Researchers highlighted multiple historical instances where conclusions drawn from observational data led to changes in medical practice, which were later refuted by randomized controlled trials (RCTs). The phenomenon emphasizes the challenges of distinguishing correlation from causation, particularly in the absence of robust experimental controls.

== The role of cognitive bias ==
Researchers aiming to use observational data to infer causation must control for confounding variables, as failing to do so can lead to spurious correlations, which then lead to mistakenly inferring causal relationships from mere associations between variables. (Note: The differentiation between association and causation is a significant challenge in medical research, often further complicated by cognitive biases that erroneously interpret coincidental observational data as indicative of causality.) Associations in observational studies may not indicate causation and can arise due to random error (chance), systematic error (bias), or confounding variables influencing both the predictor and outcome.

One of the primary challenges in observational studies is bias due to confounding. Confounding occurs when an unmeasured or unaccounted variable influences both the exposure and the outcome, creating a false appearance of a causal relationship. For example, in studies linking smoking to higher rates of suicide, the hypothesis arose because smokers were disproportionately represented among suicide cases. Observational data showed that individuals who committed suicide were more likely to be smokers compared to the general population. This led to the assumption that smoking itself might be a risk factor for suicidal behavior. However, further investigations revealed that this association was likely due to confounding factors, such as underlying mental health conditions that are more prevalent among smokers. These conditions, including depression and anxiety, could independently contribute to both smoking behavior and an increased risk of suicide, thereby creating a false impression of a direct causal link between smoking and suicide.

Cognitive biases can exacerbate the misinterpretation of observational data. These biases lead researchers, clinicians, or policymakers to focus on information that aligns with pre-existing beliefs while disregarding conflicting evidence. This creates a feedback loop where preliminary conclusions—often derived from confounded observational data—are reinforced by selective interpretation or the improper use of causal language. Terms like "association," even when accurately used, may still be misinterpreted as implying causation, further amplifying the issue. One prominent example is the post hoc ergo propter hoc fallacy — a Latin phrase meaning "after this, therefore because of this." This fallacy occurs when a temporal sequence is mistaken for a causal relationship, leading to the erroneous assumption that if one event follows another, the former must have caused the latter. Such reasoning can be deceptive, as the apparent connection between events may overlook critical variables that could explain the observed outcomes.

Another key contributor is confirmation bias, which involves systematic deviations from rational judgment. This bias leads individuals to focus on information that supports their preconceptions while dismissing or undervaluing evidence to the contrary. For example, researchers may selectively interpret uncertain data as supportive of their hypotheses, reinforcing initial assumptions even when contradictory evidence emerges. This selective perception creates a self-reinforcing cycle, where flawed conclusions persist despite being challenged or invalidated by new findings.

The observational interpretation fallacy is the cognitive bias where correlations identified in observational studies are erroneously interpreted as evidence of causality. This misinterpretation can significantly influence clinical guidelines and healthcare practices, potentially compromising patient safety and the efficient allocation of resources. The fallacy often manifests when the inherent limitations of observational studies, such as confounding factors and the lack of controlled interventions, are overlooked in the rush to apply findings to clinical practice.

The observational interpretation fallacy differs from individual cognitive biases by influencing the collective judgment within the scientific community. This bias arises not solely from observing coinciding events but from the misinterpretation of these observations in scientific literature. As a result, the fallacy can lead to the establishment of clinical practices and guidelines that lack a foundation in rigorously tested evidence.

Unlike individual biases such as confirmation bias, the observational interpretation fallacy operates on a broader scale, affecting the direction of medical research and the implementation of healthcare interventions. By shaping scientific consensus and influencing policy decisions, this fallacy can perpetuate flawed interpretations of observational data, resulting in widespread implications for clinical practice and resource allocation.

== Examples ==
Sixteen major examples have been identified in the scientific literature where the erroneous interpretation of observational data led to significant consequences in clinical practice and health policy.

=== Bendectin and birth defects ===
From 1956 to 1983, Bendectin was a widely prescribed medication in the United States, with up to 25% of pregnant women using it at its peak. However, in 1980, observational studies erroneously linked Bendectin to birth defects, sparking widespread concern and a flood of lawsuits against its manufacturer, Merrell. The legal challenges dramatically increased the company's insurance costs to $10 million annually—far exceeding the drug's $3 million revenue—ultimately forcing its withdrawal from the market.

The absence of Bendectin had serious consequences: hospitalizations for pregnancy-related nausea doubled, highlighting the drug's unique effectiveness. Years later, subsequent research debunked the teratogenic claims, and the FDA reapproved Bendectin in 2014.

=== Hormone replacement therapy (HRT) and cardiovascular disease ===
One of the most notable examples of misinterpreted observational data is the widespread adoption of hormone replacement therapy (HRT) to alleviate menopausal symptoms and reduce cardiovascular disease risk. This practice was initially driven by observational studies suggesting a lower incidence of heart disease among women using HRT compared to non-users. These findings were interpreted as evidence of a causal relationship, leading to the broad prescription of HRT without rigorous evaluation.

Early warnings from randomized trials that challenged this assumption were met with skepticism. However, the landmark Women's Health Initiative (WHI) randomized clinical trial definitively overturned the prevailing belief. The WHI trial demonstrated that HRT not only failed to offer cardiovascular protection but also significantly increased the risks of breast cancer, stroke, and blood clots. This dramatic reversal necessitated a complete overhaul of clinical guidelines for HRT use, highlighting the risks of relying on observational data alone to inform healthcare practices.

=== Antioxidant supplements and cancer prevention ===
Observational data once linked antioxidants such as vitamins A, C, and E to a reduced risk of cancer, fueling widespread recommendations for supplementation. However, randomized trials like the Beta-Carotene and Retinol Efficacy Trial (CARET) and the Alpha-Tocopherol, Beta-Carotene Cancer Prevention Study (ATBC Study) revealed not only a lack of benefit but an increased risk of cancer, particularly lung cancer among smokers. These findings prompted a reevaluation of antioxidant supplementation guidelines, highlighting the dangers of prematurely endorsing interventions based on observational studies.

== The importance of randomized controlled trials (RCTs) ==
Randomized controlled trials (RCTs) are considered the gold standard in medical research for establishing causality. By randomly assigning participants to either an intervention or control group, RCTs ensure that variables such as age, health status, and lifestyle are evenly distributed between groups. This randomization creates two comparable groups, making the intervention the only meaningful difference, which allows researchers to isolate cause-and-effect relationships. Unlike observational studies, which can only identify associations and are subject to confounding factors, RCTs provide reliable evidence by eliminating bias and external influences. While they are not always feasible due to ethical, logistical, or financial constraints, their ability to rigorously test interventions makes them the foundation of evidence-based medicine.
