= Trivialization =

Trivialization or trivialisation may refer to:

- Trivialization (mathematics), a trivialization of a fiber bundle
- Trivialization (psychology), a form of minimization, a cognitive distortion
