= Half-truth =

Deceptive statement

A half-truth is a deceptive statement that includes some element of truth. The statement might be partly true, the statement may be totally true, but only part of the whole truth, or it may use some deceptive element, such as improper punctuation, or double meaning, especially if the intent is to deceive, evade, blame or misrepresent the truth.

== Purpose ==
The purpose and/or consequence of a half-truth is to make something that is really only a belief appear to be knowledge, or a truthful statement to represent the whole truth or possibly lead to a false conclusion. The order in which the true and false information is presented in a "half-truth" can make a difference in ultimate believability. Barchetti and colleagues show that when two unrelated statements are put together with syntax that suggests causality, the statement is believed if the premise is true (even if the conclusion is unrelated or false). Conversely, if the false statement is placed in the premise, the combined statement is less likely to be believed. Thus the order of presentation can influence the credibility of a half-true statement and has been named the half-truth effect.

== Examples ==
- In January 2018, U.S. President Donald Trump claimed on Twitter that "because of my policies, Black Unemployment has just been reported to be at the LOWEST RATE EVER RECORDED!" Although the unemployment rate for black Americans was indeed at a record low, the rate had been consistently decreasing since 2010, seven years before Trump took office.
- Using a technicality: former U.S. President Bill Clinton famously engaged in a half-truth when he gave the testimony of "I did not have sexual relations with that woman, Ms. Lewinsky." Here he engaged in an equivocation fallacy to deliberately indicate one particular meaning of the phrase "sexual relations", while intending another meaning, to deliberately mislead the court while still being able to later claim that "my statements were technically correct."
- Another example of using a technicality was U.S. President Trump's claim that taxes were being allocated for condoms to be sent to Gaza Strip during the Gaza war, while the actual location was Gaza Province, Mozambique.
- The classic story about blind men and an elephant. Each blind man touches a different part of the elephant and reaches a different conclusion about the nature of the elephant; while each man's experience of the elephant is accurate, none of them have a full understanding of the nature of the beast. One may be touching the tail and believe that the elephant is long and thin; another may be touching the belly and say that it is round and big.

== Politics ==
Some forms of half-truths are an inescapable part of politics in representative democracies. The reputation of a political candidate can be irreparably damaged if they are exposed in a lie, so a complex style of language has evolved to minimise the chance of this happening. If someone has not said something, they cannot reasonably be accused of lying. As a consequence, politics has become a world where half-truths are expected, and political statements are rarely accepted at face value.

William Safire defines a half-truth, for political purposes, as "a statement accurate enough to require an explanation; and the longer the explanation, the more likely a public reaction of half-belief".

It has been shown that the order of the half-truth makes a difference in reported belief in the statement. That is when a statement begins with a true statement followed by another unrelated statement (either true or false), the statement is believed. However, when the false statement is put in front, then the entire package is less believed regardless of whether the second part of the argument is true or false. This also indicates the anchoring effect, which is a tendency of people to believe the first thing said which acts as an anchor point in believing, or disbelieving, what follows and is also found in reference pricing used in price promotions. Consumer behaviour and psychology studies show the heavy influence of the order and presentation of information in what beliefs people generally may be likely to form as well as decoy items that may be the early information.

In his 1990 work The Magic Lantern: The Revolution of 1989 Witnessed in Warsaw, Budapest, Berlin, and Prague, Timothy Garton Ash responded to Václav Havel's call for "living in truth":

Now we expect many things of politicians in a well-functioning parliamentary democracy. But "living in truth" is not one of them. In fact the essence of democratic politics might rather be described as "working in half-truth". Parliamentary democracy is, at its heart, a system of limited adversarial mendacity, in which each party attempts to present part of the truth as if it were the whole.

Philosopher Alfred North Whitehead was quoted as saying: "There are no whole truths; all truths are half-truths. It is trying to treat them as whole truths that play the devil". If this is true, statements, or truths, which according to Whitehead are all half-truths, are susceptible to creating deceptive and false conclusions.

== Meme theory ==
Richard Brodie links half-truths to memes, writing, "the truth of any proposition depends on the assumptions you make in considering it—the distinct memes you use in thinking about it". Brodie considers half-truths a necessary part of human interaction because they allow practical application of ideas when it is impractical to convey all the information needed to make a fully informed decision, although some half-truths can lead to false conclusions or inferences in the world of logic.

== Quotations ==
The notion of half-truths has existed in various cultures, giving rise to several epigrammatic sayings.

- Karl Kraus, an Austrian journalist, critic, playwright, and poet, noted, "An aphorism can never be the whole truth; it is either a half-truth or a truth-and-a-half."
- Arthur Koestler, a Hungarian-British author and journalist, wrote, "Two half-truths do not make a truth, and two half-cultures do not make a culture."

== Selective truth ==
Selective truth is an act of telling some part of the truth selectively, both intentionally and unintentionally.

Both intentional and unintentional selective truth are not a truth at all.

=== Ethics and morality ===
While selective truth information is not the truth information, whether telling selective truth is considered deceptive or lying and the morality are subject to debate. Some scholars think it is deceptive and lying and some scholars think the opposite. Some philosophers consider selective truth deceptive but not lying. Some philosophers simply consider it not lying.

== See also ==
- Alternative facts
- Casuistry
- Degree of truth
- Economical with the truth
- Fallacy of the single cause
- Fuzzy logic
- Jesuitical answer
- Jumping to conclusions
- Lie
- Limited hangout
- Minimisation (psychology)
- Modified limited hangout
- Multi-valued logic
- Omission bias
- Political correctness
- Principle of bivalence
- Quoting out of context
- Sophistry
- Truthiness
- Weasel word
- Cherry picking
