= Jumping to conclusions =

Psychological term

Jumping to conclusions (officially the jumping conclusion bias, often abbreviated as JTC, and also referred to as the inference-observation confusion) is a psychological term referring to a communication obstacle where one "judge[s] or decide[s] something without having all the facts; to reach unwarranted conclusions". In other words, it is when a person fails to distinguish between what they have observed first hand, and what they have only inferred or assumed. Because it involves making decisions without having enough information to be sure that one is right, this can give rise to poor or rash decisions.

== Subtypes ==
Three commonly recognized subtypes are as follows:

- Mind reading – Where there is a sense of access to special knowledge of the intentions or thoughts of others. People may assume that others think negatively of them. An example is "people must hate me because I am fat".
- Fortune telling – Where one has inflexible expectations for how things will turn out before they happen. A person may predict the outcome of something will be negative before they have any evidence to suggest that may be the case. Examples include "there's no point starting a diet because I'll just break it" and "I'll just have one more cupcake".
- Labeling – Labeling occurs when someone overgeneralizes characteristics of other people. For example, someone might use an unfavorable term to describe a complex person or event.

== Information ==
Jumping to conclusions is a form of cognitive distortion. Often, a person will make a negative assumption when it is not fully supported by the facts.

In some cases misinterpretation of what a subject has sensed, i.e., the incorrect decoding of incoming messages, can come about due to jumping to conclusions. This can often be because the same sign can have multiple meanings. An example given in Communicating for Results: A Guide for Business and the Professions is of an employee avoiding eye contact while being questioned over a missing item – it may suggest their guilt to the crime, but it may also suggest other things such as their embarrassment at their integrity being questioned, or even a "gesture of respect for...authority". Even if the questionee shows more signs of guilt, such as sweating and avoiding answers, one is still making an assumption when they link these symptoms to the theft. These assumptions are examples of jumping to conclusions, and could have resulted in faux pas if pursued further without the evidence to back it up.

While we all "jump to conclusions" in a sense by making inferences and assumptions based on the information we have available, and quite often a job requires that one acts upon educated guesswork, in such cases one is making a calculated risk – they are aware they are basing their decisions on an assumption which has a degree of uncertainty associated with it. Mistakes are much more likely when people are unaware that they have jumped to conclusions, and instead think that their assumptions are actually knowledge.

It is easy for interviewers to jump to conclusions, often resulting in a "costly hiring error due to false inference". Asking for clarification is a good way to help investigate inferences further.

An example of jumping to conclusions is when one makes assumptions about what someone else is going to say, often by cutting them off with the words "I know what you're going to say". Saying things like "wow, geez, and what a shame" can make one come across as more interested in looking supportive than what the other person is saying. Therefore, assuming that a story-teller wants overly-compassionate responses can have its downsides, especially if they seem non-genuine and only maintained in order to uphold some kind of social expectation.

Working out what context a phrase is being used in can help avoid one jumping to conclusions.

In order to prevent the wrongful assessment of children, observation is an essential part of an early years worker's job. Multiple observations, of the child reacting in different circumstances, should be carried out to help show a context for certain symptoms and allow then to work out if they are part of a larger issue. Meta-analyses have linked exaggerated jumping to conclusions with the formation of delusions.

When medical professionals misdiagnose, it's often the result of having jumped to conclusions. Jerome Groopman, author of How Doctors Think, says that "most incorrect diagnoses are due to physicians' misconceptions of their patients, not technical mistakes like a faulty lab test". Ways in which doctors jump to conclusions include the following: they assume the patient will state all relevant symptoms (or are forced to make an assumption due to thinking that seeking further personal information may lead to embarrassment), they assume the patient will not want to undergo any unpleasant (albeit effective) treatment, they assume the patient is a hypochondriac and therefore do not take their complaints seriously, or they make a diagnosis even though they have not heard or understood all of the complaint and for whatever reason do not ask for clarification.

== Comedy ==
Urban Legends by Jan Harold Brunvand describes how jumping to conclusions, along with the techniques of slapstick humour, can be used to create comedy. The example provided by the book (called The Gerbil-Caused Accident) involves a woman driving to her son's show and tell lesson, with a pet gerbil in a box by her side. It escapes and begins to crawl up her pant leg. She pulls over, gets out of the car, and proceeds to jump up and down and shake her leg in order to get rid of the animal. A passerby think she is having a seizure, so he approaches and wraps his arms around her to calm her down. Another passerby sees the struggle, and assuming the first passerby is an attacker, punches him in the face. The woman then attempts to explain what really happened. The "neat" 3-part structure and the unresolved conclusion make this example 'legendary'. Sometimes these stories are adapted from real situations, and students are sometimes asked to work out the legal issues involved.

In this context, jumping to conclusions is a theme of urban legends. It serves as a twist in which "someone jumps to an incorrect conclusion, thus setting himself or herself up for some kind of uncomfortable, often hilarious downfall".

== See also ==
- Correlation does not imply causation
- Fallacy of the single cause
- Fallacy
- Half-truth
- Leap of faith
- Post hoc ergo propter hoc
- Presumption of guilt
- The Phantom Tollbooth
