= Limited hangout =

Espionage jargon

A limited hangout or partial hangout is a tactic used in media relations, perception management, politics, and information management. The tactic originated as a technique in the espionage trade.

According to Victor Marchetti, a former special assistant to the deputy director of the Central Intelligence Agency (CIA), a limited hangout is "spy jargon for a favorite and frequently used gimmick of the clandestine professionals. When their veil of secrecy is shredded and they can no longer rely on a phony cover story to misinform the public, they resort to admitting—sometimes even volunteering—some of the truth while still managing to withhold the key and damaging facts in the case. The public, however, is usually so intrigued by the new information that it never thinks to pursue the matter further". While used by the CIA and other intelligence organizations, the tactic has become popularized in the corporate and political spheres.

== Modified limited hangout ==
In a March 22, 1973, meeting between United States President Richard Nixon, John Dean, John Ehrlichman, John N. Mitchell, and H. R. Haldeman, Ehrlichman incorporated the term into a new and related one, "modified limited hangout".

The phrase was coined in the following exchange:

PRESIDENT: You think, you think we want to, want to go this route now? And the – let it hang out, so to speak?

DEAN: Well, it's, it isn't really that –
HALDEMAN: It's a limited hang out.
DEAN: It's a limited hang out.
EHRLICHMAN: It's a modified limited hang out.

PRESIDENT: Well, it's only the questions of the thing hanging out publicly or privately.

Before this exchange, the discussion captures Nixon outlining to Dean the content of a report that Dean would create, laying out a misleading view of the role of the White House staff in events surrounding the Watergate burglary. In Ehrlichman's words: "And the report says, 'Nobody was involved'". The document would then be shared with the United States Senate Watergate Committee investigating the affair. The report would serve the administration's goals by protecting the President, providing documentary support for his false statements should information come to light that contradicted his stated position. Further, the group discusses having information on the report leaked by those on the Committee sympathetic to the President, to put exculpatory information into the public sphere.

The phrase has been cited as a summation of the strategy of mixing partial admissions with misinformation and resistance to further investigation, and is used in political commentary to accuse people or groups of following a Nixon-like strategy. It has also been described as the release of a package of sensitive information mixed with discoverable falsehoods in hopes that discovery of the falsity of part will lead to the entire package being considered false, and as the release of a package with a core of falsehoods wrapped in secret but verifiable information in hopes that verification of the wrapping will reinforce the believability of the false core.

Writing in The Washington Post, Mary McGrory described a statement by Pope John Paul II regarding sexual abuse by priests as a "modified, limited hangout".

== See also ==
- Half-truth
- Mental reservation
- Minimisation (psychology)
- Spin (propaganda)
