= Correlation does not imply causation =

Refutation of a logical fallacy

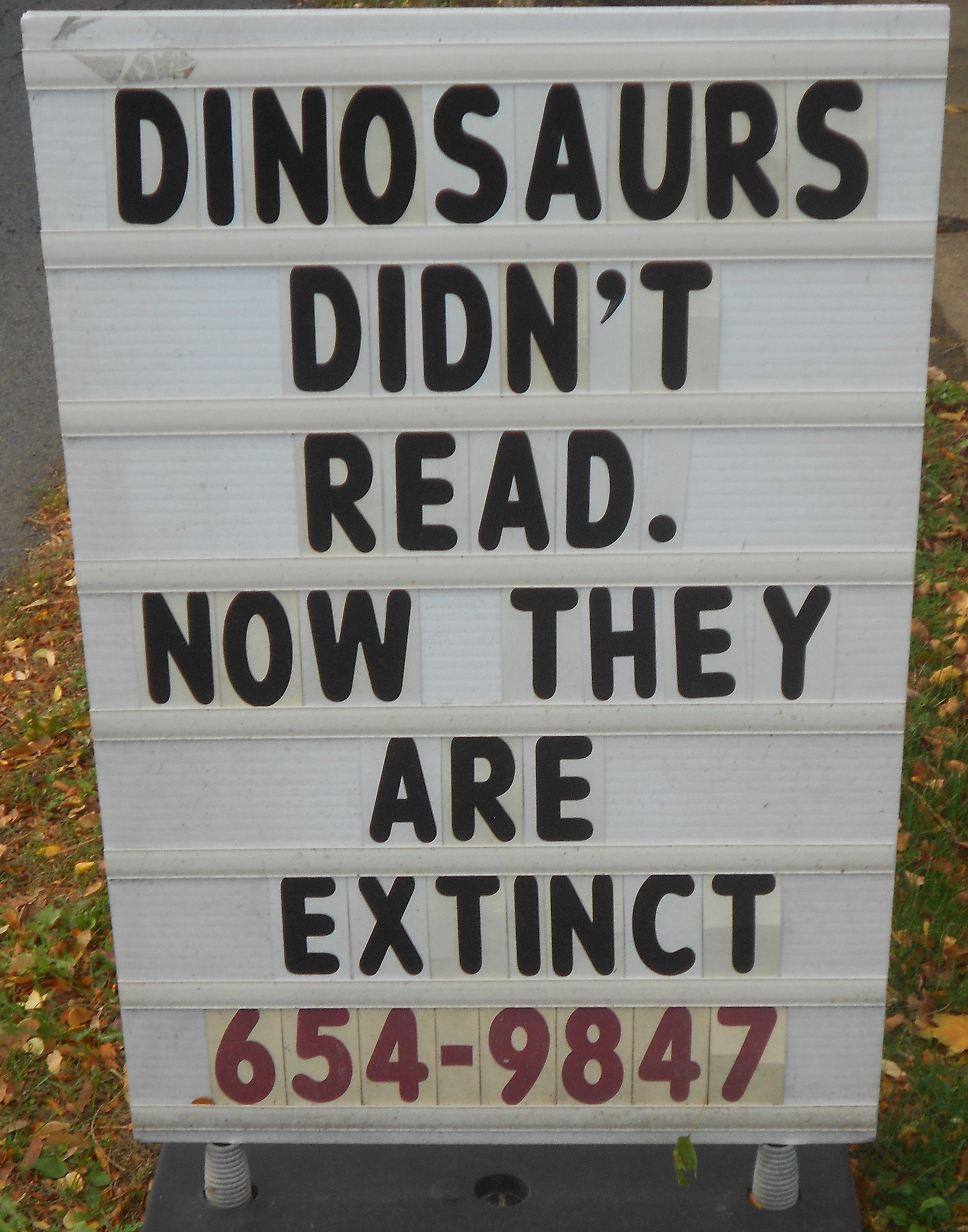
Dinosaur illiteracy and extinction may be correlated, but that would not mean the variables had a causal relationship.

The phrase "correlation does not imply causation" refers to the inability to legitimately deduce a cause-and-effect relationship between two events or variables solely on the basis of an observed association or correlation between them. The idea that "correlation implies causation" is an example of a questionable-cause logical fallacy, in which two events occurring together are taken to have established a cause-and-effect relationship.

This fallacy is also known by the Latin phrase cum hoc ergo propter hoc ('with this, therefore because of this'). This differs from the fallacy known as post hoc ergo propter hoc ('after this, therefore because of this'), in which an event following another is seen as a necessary consequence of the former event, and from conflation, the errant merging of two events, ideas, databases, etc., into one.

As with any logical fallacy, identifying that the reasoning behind an argument is flawed does not necessarily imply that the resulting conclusion is false. Statistical methods have been proposed that use correlation as the basis for hypothesis tests for causality, including the Granger causality test and convergent cross mapping. The Bradford Hill criteria, also known as Hill's criteria for causation, are a group of nine principles that can be useful in considering the epidemiologic evidence of a causal relationship . Ultimately, assumptions are always required to draw causal conclusions, and modern causal inference frameworks focus on interrogating the strength of these assumptions.

== Usage and meaning of terms ==
=== "Imply" ===
In casual use, the word implies loosely means suggests, rather than requires. However, in logic, the technical use of the word implies means "is a sufficient condition for." That is the meaning intended by statisticians when they say causation is not certain. Indeed, p implies q has the technical meaning of the material conditional: if p then q symbolized as p → q. That is, "if circumstance p is true, then q follows." In that sense, it is always correct to say "Correlation does not imply causation."

=== "Cause" ===
The word cause (or causation) has multiple meanings in English. In philosophical terminology, cause can refer to necessary, sufficient, or contributing causes. In examining correlation, cause is most often used to mean "one contributing cause" (but not necessarily the only contributing cause).

== Causal analysis ==
Causal analysis is the field of experimental design and statistics pertaining to establishing cause and effect. Typically it involves establishing four elements: correlation, sequence in time (that is, causes must occur before their proposed effect), a plausible physical or information-theoretical mechanism for an observed effect to follow from a possible cause, and eliminating the possibility of common and alternative ("special") causes. Such analysis usually involves one or more controlled or natural experiments.

== Causal inference ==
Causal inference is the process of determining the independent, actual effect of a particular phenomenon that is a component of a larger system. The main difference between causal inference and inference of association is that causal inference analyzes the response of an effect variable when a cause of the effect variable is changed.

The study of why things occur is called etiology, and can be described using the language of scientific causal notation. Causal inference is said to provide the evidence of causality theorized by causal reasoning. Causal inference is widely studied across all sciences. Several innovations in the development and implementation of methodology designed to determine causality have proliferated in recent decades. Causal inference remains especially difficult where experimentation is difficult or impossible, which is common throughout most sciences.

The approaches to causal inference are broadly applicable across all types of scientific disciplines, and many methods of causal inference that were designed for certain disciplines have found use in other disciplines. This article outlines the basic process behind causal inference and details some of the more conventional tests used across different disciplines; however, this should not be mistaken as a suggestion that these methods apply only to those disciplines, merely that they are the most commonly used in that discipline.

Causal inference is difficult to perform and there is significant debate amongst scientists about the proper way to determine causality. Despite other innovations, there remain concerns of misattribution by scientists of correlative results as causal, of the usage of incorrect methodologies by scientists, and of deliberate manipulation by scientists of analytical results in order to obtain statistically significant estimates. Particular concern is raised in the use of regression models, especially linear regression models.

== Examples of illogically inferring causation from correlation ==
=== B causes A (reverse causation or reverse causality) ===
Reverse causation or reverse causality or wrong direction is an informal fallacy of questionable cause where cause and effect are reversed. The cause is said to be the effect and vice versa.

==== Windmills and wind ====
The faster that windmills are observed to rotate, the more wind is observed.
Therefore, wind is caused by the rotation of windmills. (Or, simply put: windmills, as their name indicates, are machines used to produce wind.)

In this example, the correlation (simultaneity) between windmill activity and wind velocity does not imply that wind is caused by windmills. It is rather the other way around, as suggested by the fact that wind does not need windmills to exist, while windmills need wind to rotate. Wind can be observed in places where there are no windmills or non-rotating windmills—and there are good reasons to believe that wind existed before the invention of windmills.

==== Cholesterol and mortality ====
Low cholesterol is associated with an increase in mortality.
Therefore, low cholesterol increases your risk of mortality.

Causality is actually the other way around, since some diseases, such as cancer, cause low cholesterol due to a myriad of factors, such as weight loss, and they also cause an increase in mortality. This can also be seen in alcoholics. As alcoholics become diagnosed with cirrhosis of the liver, many quit drinking. However, they also experience an increased risk of mortality. In these instances, it is the diseases that cause an increased risk of mortality, but the increased mortality is attributed to the beneficial effects that follow the diagnosis, making healthy changes look unhealthy.

==== Children and television ====
In other cases, it may simply be unclear which is the cause and which is the effect. For example:

Children that watch a lot of TV are the most violent. Clearly, TV makes children more violent.

This could easily be the other way round; that is, violent children like watching more TV than less violent ones.

==== Drug abuse and mental illness ====
A correlation between recreational drug use and psychiatric disorders might be either way around: perhaps the drugs cause the disorders, or perhaps people use drugs to self medicate for preexisting conditions. Gateway drug theory may argue that marijuana usage leads to usage of harder drugs, but hard drug usage may lead to marijuana usage (see also confusion of the inverse). Indeed, in the social sciences where controlled experiments often cannot be used to discern the direction of causation, this fallacy can fuel long-standing scientific arguments. One such example can be found in education economics, between the screening or signaling and human capital models: it could either be that having innate ability enables one to complete an education, or that completing an education builds one's ability.

==== Lice and health ====
A historical example of this is that Europeans in the Middle Ages believed that lice were beneficial to health since there would rarely be any lice on sick people. The reasoning was that the people got sick because the lice left. The real reason however is that lice are extremely sensitive to body temperature. A small increase of body temperature, such as in a fever, makes the lice look for another host. The medical thermometer had not yet been invented and so that increase in temperature was rarely noticed. Noticeable symptoms came later, which gave the impression that the lice had left before the person became sick.

In other cases, two phenomena can each be a partial cause of the other; consider poverty and lack of education, or procrastination and poor self-esteem. One making an argument based on these two phenomena must however be careful to avoid the fallacy of circular cause and consequence. Poverty is a cause of lack of education, but it is not the sole cause, and vice versa.

=== Third factor C (the common-causal variable) causes both A and B ===
The third-cause fallacy (also known as ignoring a common cause or questionable cause) is a logical fallacy in which a spurious relationship is confused for causation. It asserts that X causes Y when in reality, both X and Y are caused by Z. It is a variation on the post hoc ergo propter hoc fallacy and a member of the questionable cause group of fallacies.

All of those examples deal with a lurking variable, which is simply a hidden third variable that affects both of the variables observed to be correlated. That third variable is also known as a confounding variable, with the slight difference that confounding variables need not be hidden and may thus be corrected for in an analysis. Note that the Wikipedia link to lurking variable redirects to confounding. A difficulty often also arises where the third factor, though fundamentally different from A and B, is so closely related to A and/or B as to be confused with them or very difficult to scientifically disentangle from them (see Example 4).

Example 1
Sleeping with one's shoes on is strongly correlated with waking up with a headache.
Therefore, sleeping with one's shoes on causes headache.

The above example commits the correlation-implies-causation fallacy, as it prematurely concludes that sleeping with one's shoes on causes headache. A more plausible explanation is that both are caused by a third factor, in this case going to bed drunk, which thereby gives rise to a correlation. So the conclusion is false.

Example 2
Young children who sleep with the light on are much more likely to develop myopia in later life.
Therefore, sleeping with the light on causes myopia.

This is a scientific example that resulted from a study at the University of Pennsylvania Medical Center. Published in the May 13, 1999, issue of Nature, the study received much coverage at the time in the popular press. However, a later study at Ohio State University did not find that infants sleeping with the light on caused the development of myopia. It did find a strong link between parental myopia and the development of child myopia, also noting that myopic parents were more likely to leave a light on in their children's bedroom. In this case, the cause of both conditions is parental myopia, and the above-stated conclusion is false.

Example 3
As ice cream sales increase, the rate of drowning deaths increases sharply.
Therefore, ice cream consumption causes drowning.

This example fails to recognize the importance of time of year and temperature to ice cream sales. Ice cream is sold during the hot summer months at a much greater rate than during colder times, and it is during these hot summer months that people are more likely to engage in activities involving water, such as swimming. The increased drowning deaths are simply caused by more exposure to water-based activities, not ice cream. The stated conclusion is false.

Example 4
A hypothetical study shows a relationship between test anxiety scores and shyness scores, with a statistical r value (strength of correlation) of +.59.
Therefore, it may be simply concluded that shyness, in some part, causally influences test anxiety.

However, as encountered in many psychological studies, another variable, a "self-consciousness score", is discovered that has a sharper correlation (+.73) with shyness. This suggests a possible "third variable" problem, however, when three such closely related measures are found, it further suggests that each may have bidirectional tendencies (see "bidirectional variable", above), being a cluster of correlated values each influencing one another to some extent. Therefore, the simple conclusion above may be false.

Example 5
Since the 1950s, both the atmospheric CO_{2} level and obesity levels have increased sharply.
Hence, atmospheric CO_{2} causes obesity.

Richer populations tend to eat more food and produce more CO_{2}.

Example 6
HDL ("good") cholesterol is negatively correlated with incidence of heart attack.
Therefore, taking medication to raise HDL decreases the chance of having a heart attack.

Further research has called this conclusion into question. Instead, it may be that other underlying factors, like genes, diet and exercise, affect both HDL levels and the likelihood of having a heart attack; it is possible that medicines may affect the directly measurable factor, HDL levels, without affecting the chance of heart attack.

=== Bidirectional causation: A causes B, and B causes A ===
Causality is not necessarily one-way; in a predator-prey relationship, predator numbers affect prey numbers, but prey numbers, i.e. food supply, also affect predator numbers. Another well-known example is that cyclists have a lower Body Mass Index than people who do not cycle. This is often explained by assuming that cycling increases physical activity levels and therefore decreases BMI. Because results from prospective studies on people who increase their bicycle use show a smaller effect on BMI than cross-sectional studies, there may be some reverse causality as well. For example, people with a lower BMI may be more likely to want to cycle in the first place.

=== The relationship between A and B is coincidental ===
The two variables are not related at all, but correlate by chance. The more things are examined, the more likely it is that two unrelated variables will appear to be related. For example:

- The result of the last home game by the Washington Commanders prior to the presidential election predicted the outcome of every presidential election from 1936 to 2000 inclusive, despite the fact that the outcomes of football games had nothing to do with the outcome of the popular election. This streak was finally broken in 2004 (or 2012 using an alternative formulation of the original rule).
- The Mierscheid law, which correlates the Social Democratic Party of Germany's share of the popular vote with the size of crude steel production in Western Germany.
- Alternating bald–hairy Russian leaders: A bald (or obviously balding) state leader of Russia has succeeded a non-bald ("hairy") one, and vice versa, for nearly 200 years.
- The Bible code, Hebrew words predicting historical events supposedly hidden within the Torah: the huge number of combinations of letters makes appearances of any word in sufficiently lengthy text statistically insignificant.

== Use of correlation as scientific evidence ==
Much of scientific evidence is based upon a correlation of variables, which are observed to occur together. Scientists are careful to point out that correlation does not necessarily mean causation. The assumption that A causes B simply because A correlates with B is not accepted as a legitimate form of argument; however, sometimes people commit the opposite fallacy of dismissing correlation entirely. That would dismiss a large swath of important scientific evidence.

Since it may be difficult or ethically impossible to run controlled double-blind studies to address certain questions, correlational evidence from several different angles may be useful for prediction despite failing to provide evidence for causation. For example, social workers might be interested in knowing how child abuse relates to academic performance. Although it would be unethical to perform an experiment in which children are randomly assigned to receive or not receive abuse, researchers can look at existing groups using a non-experimental correlational design. If in fact a negative correlation exists between abuse and academic performance, researchers could potentially use this knowledge of a statistical correlation to make predictions about children outside the study who experience abuse even though the study failed to provide causal evidence that abuse decreases academic performance.

The combination of limited available methodologies with the dismissing correlation fallacy has on occasion been used to counter a scientific finding. For example, the tobacco industry has historically relied on a dismissal of correlational evidence to reject a link between tobacco smoke and lung cancer, as did biologist and statistician Ronald Fisher (frequently on the industry's behalf). Correlation is a valuable type of scientific evidence in fields such as medicine, psychology, and sociology. Correlations must first be confirmed as real, and every possible causative relationship must then be systematically explored. In the end, correlation alone cannot be used as evidence for a cause-and-effect relationship between a treatment and benefit, a risk factor and a disease, or a social or economic factor and various outcomes. It is one of the most abused types of evidence because it is easy and even tempting to come to premature conclusions based upon the preliminary appearance of a correlation.

== See also ==
- Affirming the consequent – Type of fallacious argument (logical fallacy)
- Alignments of random points – Phenomenon in statistics
- Anecdotal evidence – Evidence relying on personal testimony
- Apophenia – Tendency to perceive connections between unrelated things
- Bible code – Purported set of secret messages encoded within the Hebrew text of the Torah
  - Data dredging – Misuse of data analysis
  - Look-elsewhere effect – Statistical analysis phenomenon
  - Multiple comparisons problem – Statistical interpretation with many tests
  - Post hoc analysis – Statistical analyses that were not specified before the data were seen
  - Testing hypotheses suggested by the data – Problem of circular reasoning in statistics
- Bradford Hill criteria – Criteria for measuring cause and effect
- Causal inference – Branch of statistics
- Coincidence#Causality – Concurrence of events with no connection
- Confounding – Bias in causal inference
- Confusion of the inverse – Logical fallacy
- Curse of the rainbow jersey – Example of such a correlation fallacy in sport
- French paradox – Observation that heart disease in French people is much less than is expected
- Design of experiments – Design of tasks
- Mediation (statistics) – Statistical model
- Normally distributed and uncorrelated does not imply independent
- Pirates in terms of global warming – Satirical deity
- Reproducibility – Aspect of scientific research
- Spurious relationship – Apparent, but false, correlation between causally-independent variables
- Synchronicity – Jungian concept of the meaningfulness of acausal coincidences
- Teleology – Thinking in terms of destiny or purpose
