= Flag-waving =

Fallacious argument exploiting connection to nationalism

Flag-waving is a fallacious argument or propaganda technique used to justify an action based on the undue connection to nationalism or patriotism or benefit for an idea, group or country. It is a variant of argumentum ad populum. This fallacy appeals to emotion instead to logic of the audience aiming to manipulate them to win an argument. All ad populum fallacies are based on the presumption that the recipients already have certain beliefs, biases, and prejudices about the issue.

If flag-waving is based on connecting to some symbol of patriotism or nationalism, it is a form of appeal to stirring symbols which can be based on undue connection not only to nationalism, but also to some religious or cultural symbols, such as a politician appearing on TV with children, farmers, teachers, the "common" man, etc.

The act of flag-waving is a superficial display of support or loyalty to, for example, a nation or a political party.
