= Confusion of the inverse =

Logical fallacy

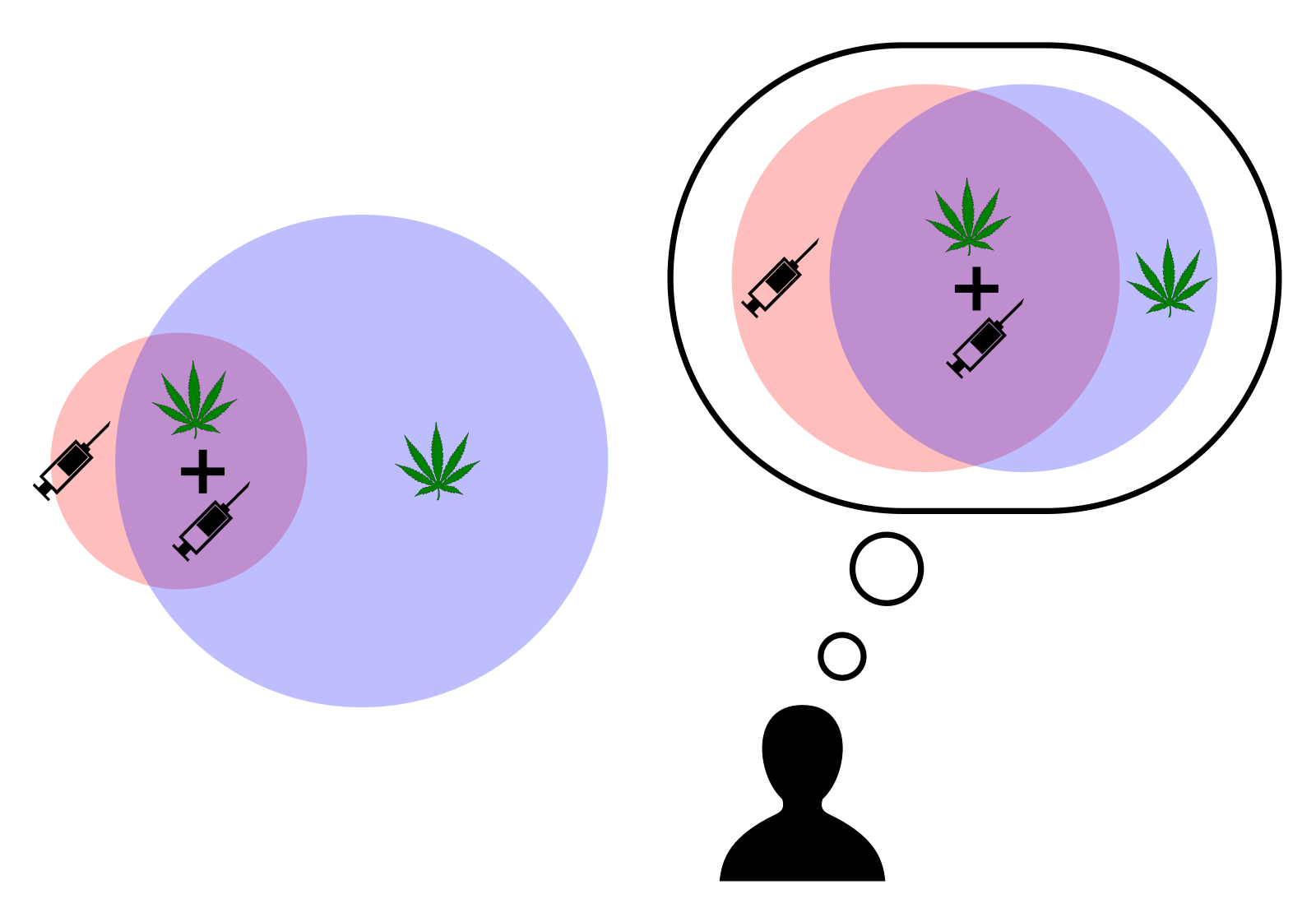
Graphic demonstration of the logical fallacy "Confusion of the Inverse"

Confusion of the inverse, also called the conditional probability fallacy or the inverse fallacy, is a logical fallacy whereupon a conditional probability is equated with its inverse; that is, given two events A and B, the probability of A happening given that B has happened is assumed to be about the same as the probability of B given A, when there is actually no evidence for this assumption. More formally, P(A|B) is assumed to be approximately equal to P(B|A).

== Examples ==
=== Example 1 ===
Relative size	Malignant	Benign	Total
Test positive	0.8 (true positive)	9.9 (false positive)	10.7
Test negative	0.2 (false negative)	89.1 (true negative)	89.3
Total	1	99	100

In one study, physicians were asked to give the chances of malignancy with a 1% prior probability of occurring. A test can detect 80% of malignancies and has a 10% false positive rate. What is the probability of malignancy given a positive test result? Approximately 95 out of 100 physicians responded the probability of malignancy would be about 75%, apparently because the physicians believed that the chances of malignancy given a positive test result were approximately the same as the chances of a positive test result given malignancy.

The correct probability of malignancy given a positive test result as stated above is 7.5%, derived via Bayes' theorem:

$$\begin{align}
& {}\qquad P(\text{malignant}|\text{positive}) \\[8pt]
& = \frac{P(\text{positive}|\text{malignant}) P(\text{malignant})}{P(\text{positive}|\text{malignant}) P(\text{malignant}) + P(\text{positive}|\text{benign}) P(\text{benign})} \\[8pt]
& = \frac{(0.80 \cdot 0.01)}{(0.80 \cdot 0.01) + (0.10 \cdot 0.99)} = 0.075
\end{align}$$

Other examples of confusion include:

- Hard drug users tend to use marijuana; therefore, marijuana users tend to use hard drugs (the first probability is marijuana use given hard drug use, the second is hard drug use given marijuana use).
- Most accidents occur within 25 miles from home; therefore, you are safest when you are far from home.
- Terrorists tend to have an engineering background; so, engineers have a tendency towards terrorism.

For other errors in conditional probability, see the Monty Hall problem and the base rate fallacy. Compare to illicit conversion.

=== Example 2 ===
Relative size (%)	Ill	Well	Total
Test positive	0.99 (true positive)	0.99 (false positive)	1.98
Test negative	0.01 (false negative)	98.01 (true negative)	98.02
Total	1	99	100

In order to identify individuals having a serious disease in an early curable form, one may consider screening a large group of people. While the benefits are obvious, an argument against such screenings is the disturbance caused by false positive screening results: If a person not having the disease is incorrectly found to have it by the initial test, they will most likely be distressed, and even if they subsequently take a more careful test and are told they are well, their lives may still be affected negatively. If they undertake unnecessary treatment for the disease, they may be harmed by the treatment's side effects and costs.

The magnitude of this problem is best understood in terms of conditional probabilities.

Suppose 1% of the group suffer from the disease, and the rest are well. Choosing an individual at random,

$$P(\text{ill}) = 1\% = 0.01\text{ and }P(\text{well})=99\%=0.99.$$

Suppose that when the screening test is applied to a person not having the disease, there is a 1% chance of getting a false positive result (and hence 99% chance of getting a true negative result, a number known as the specificity of the test), i.e.

$$P(\text{positive}|\text{well})=1\%,\text{ and } P(\text{negative}|\text{well})=99\%.$$

Finally, suppose that when the test is applied to a person having the disease, there is a 1% chance of a false negative result (and 99% chance of getting a true positive result, known as the sensitivity of the test), i.e.

$$P(\text{negative}|\text{ill})=1\%\text{ and }P(\text{positive}|\text{ill}) = 99\%.$$

==== Calculations ====
The fraction of individuals in the whole group who are well and test negative (true negative):

$$P(\text{well}\cap\text{negative})=P(\text{well})\times P(\text{negative}|\text{well})=99\%\times99\%=98.01\%.$$

The fraction of individuals in the whole group who are ill and test positive (true positive):

$$P(\text{ill}\cap\text{positive}) = P(\text{ill})\times P(\text{positive}|\text{ill}) = 1\%\times99\% = 0.99\%.$$

The fraction of individuals in the whole group who have false positive results:

$$P(\text{well}\cap\text{positive})=P(\text{well})\times P(\text{positive}|\text{well})=99\%\times1\%=0.99\%.$$

The fraction of individuals in the whole group who have false negative results:

$$P(\text{ill}\cap\text{negative})=P(\text{ill})\times P(\text{negative}|\text{ill}) = 1\%\times1\% = 0.01\%.$$

Furthermore, the fraction of individuals in the whole group who test positive:

$$\begin{align}
P(\text{positive}) & {} =P(\text{well }\cap\text{ positive}) + P(\text{ill} \cap \text{positive}) \\
& {} = 0.99\%+0.99\%=1.98\%.
\end{align}$$

Finally, the probability that an individual actually has the disease, given that the test result is positive:

$$P(\text{ill}|\text{positive})=\frac{P(\text{ill}\cap\text{positive})} {P(\text{positive})} = \frac{0.99\%}{1.98\%}= 50\%.$$

==== Conclusion ====
In this example, it should be easy to relate to the difference between the conditional probabilities P(positive | ill) which with the assumed probabilities is 99%, and P(ill | positive) which is 50%: the first is the probability that an individual who has the disease tests positive; the second is the probability that an individual who tests positive actually has the disease. Thus, with the probabilities picked in this example, roughly the same number of individuals receive the benefits of early treatment as are distressed by false positives; these positive and negative effects can then be considered in deciding whether to carry out the screening, or if possible whether to adjust the test criteria to decrease the number of false positives (possibly at the expense of more false negatives).

== See also ==
- Converse (logic)
- Prosecutor's fallacy
