= Post hoc ergo propter hoc =

Fallacy of assumption of causation based on sequence of events

Post hoc ergo propter hoc (Latin: 'after this, therefore because of this') is an informal fallacy that states "Because event Y followed event X, event Y must have been caused by event X". It is a fallacy in which an event is presumed to have been caused by a closely preceding event merely on the grounds of temporal succession. This type of reasoning is fallacious because mere temporal succession does not establish a causal connection. It is often shortened simply to post hoc fallacy. A logical fallacy of the questionable cause variety, it is subtly different from the fallacy cum hoc ergo propter hoc ('with this, therefore because of this'), in which two events occur simultaneously or the chronological ordering is insignificant or unknown. Post hoc ergo propter hoc is a logical fallacy in which one event is interpreted to be the cause of a later event because it occurred earlier.

Post hoc ergo propter hoc is a particularly tempting error because correlation sometimes appears to suggest causality. The fallacy lies in a conclusion based solely on the order of events, rather than taking into account other factors potentially responsible for the result that might rule out the connection.

A simple example is "The rooster crows immediately before sunrise; therefore the rooster causes the sun to rise."

== Pattern ==
The form of the post hoc fallacy is expressed as follows:

- X occurred, then Y occurred.
- Therefore, X caused Y.

When Y is undesirable, this pattern is often combined with the formal fallacy of denying the antecedent, assuming the logical inverse holds: believing that avoiding X will prevent Y.

== Examples ==
- A tenant moves into an apartment and the building's furnace develops a fault. The manager blames the tenant's arrival for the malfunction. One event merely followed the other, in the absence of causality.
- Brazilian footballer Pelé blamed a dip in his playing performance on having given his playing shirt to a fan. His play recovered after a friend, sent to retrieve the shirt from the fan, returned a shirt claimed to be the original (although it really was just a shirt Pelé had worn during his previous poor performance, as the original could not be tracked down).
- Reporting of coincidental vaccine adverse events, where people have a health complaint after being vaccinated and presume incorrectly that it was caused by the vaccination.

== See also ==
- Apophenia – Tendency to perceive connections between unrelated things
- Affirming the consequent – Type of fallacious argument (logical fallacy)
- Association fallacy – Formal fallacy
- Cargo cult – New religious movement
- Causal inference – Branch of statistics
- Coincidence – Concurrence of events with no connection
- Confirmation bias – Bias confirming existing attitudes
- Correlation does not imply causation – Refutation of a logical fallacy
- Jumping to conclusions – Psychological term
- Magical thinking – Belief in the connection of unrelated events
- Superstition – Belief or behavior that is considered irrational or supernatural
- Survivorship bias – Statistical error, form of sampling bias
- Surrogate endpoint – Biomarker proxy outcome measure
- Temporality – Concept in philosophy
- Texas sharpshooter fallacy

== Bibliography ==
1. Woods, J. H., Walton, D. N. (1977). Post Hoc, Ergo Propter Hoc.
2. Mommsen, J. K. F. (2013). Wider Das Post Hoc Ergo Propter Hoc - Primary Source Edition. United States: BiblioLife.
3. Woods, J., Walton, D. (2019). Fallacies: Selected Papers 1972–1982. Germany: De Gruyter.
