= Minimisation (psychology) =

Type of deception

Minimisation or minimization is an action where an individual intentionally downplays a situation or a thing. Minimisation, or downplaying the significance of an event or emotion, is a common strategy in dealing with feelings of guilt.

== Understatements ==
Understatement is a form of speech which contains an expression of less strength than what would be expected. A related term is euphemism, where a polite phrase is used in place of a harsher or more offensive expression.

== Self-esteem/depression ==
Redefining events to downplay their significance can be an effective way of preserving one's self-esteem. One of the problems of depression (found in those with clinical, bipolar, and chronic depressive mood disorders, as well as cyclothymia) is the tendency to do the reverse: minimising the positive, discounting praise, and dismissing one's own accomplishments. On the other hand, one technique used by Alfred Adler to combat neurosis was to minimise the excessive significance the neurotic attaches to his own symptoms—the narcissistic gains derived from pride in one's own illness.

== Social minimisation ==
Display rules expressing a group's general consensus about the display of feeling often involve minimising the amount of emotion one displays, as with a poker face. Social interchanges involving minor infringements often end with the 'victim' minimising the offence with a comment like 'Think nothing of it', using so-called 'reduction words', such as 'no big deal,' 'only a little,' 'merely,' or 'just', the last particularly useful in denying intent. On a wider scale, renaming things in a more benign or neutral form—'collateral damage' for death—is a form of minimisation.

== As a form of manipulation ==
Minimisation may also take the form of a manipulative technique:

- observed in abusers and manipulators to downplay their misdemeanors when confronted with irrefutable facts.
- observed in abusers and manipulators to downplay positive attributes (talents and skills etc.) of their victims.

Typical psychological defences exhibited by stalkers and guilty criminal suspects include denial, rationalisation, minimisation and projection of blame onto the victim.

A variation on minimisation as a manipulative technique is "claiming altruistic motives" such as saying "I don't do this because I am selfish, and for gain, but because I am a socially aware person interested in the common good".

=== School bullying ===
School bullying is one form of victimisation or physical abuse which has sometimes been unofficially encouraged, ritualised or even minimised as a sort of prank by teachers or peers. The main difference between pranks and bullying is establishment of power inequity between the bully and the victim that lasts beyond the duration of the act.

== See also ==
- Discrediting tactic
- Half-truth
- Mind games
