= Refutational preemption =

Aspect of inoculation theory

In inoculation theory, refutational preemption consists of “specific content that receivers can employ to strengthen attitudes against subsequent change.”

== Overview ==
Drawing on McGuire & Papageorgis, Pfau, et al. define the refutational preemption, or pretreatment, step of the inoculation process: "The theory posits that refutational pretreatments, which raise the specter of content potentially damaging to the receiver’s attitude while simultaneously providing direct refutation of that content in the presence of a supportive environment, threaten the individual. This triggers the motivation to bolster arguments supporting the receiver’s attitudes, thus conferring resistance".

Instead of providing the receiver with additional supporting evidence why their held beliefs are true, the receiver is provided counterarguments they may encounter in the future that might challenge their held belief. The effectiveness of this inoculation falls off as the level of effort required by the receiver to defend the belief increases.

== See also ==
- Inoculation theory
- Refutation
- William J. McGuire
