= John Jost =

American social psychologist (born 1968)

John T. Jost
- Born: 1968 (age 57–58); Toronto, Ontario, Canada
- Education: Duke University; University of Cincinnati; Yale University
- Alma mater: Walnut Hills High School, Cincinnati, Ohio
- Known for: Political behavior; intergroup relations
- Spouse: Orsolya Hunyady (m. 2001)
- Children: 2 children
- Awards: Kurt Lewin Award (2023); Carol & Ed Diener Award (2020); Career Trajectory Award (2010); Morton Deutsch Award (2007); Erik Erikson Award (2004)
- Scientific career
- Fields: Social psychology political psychology
- Institutions: New York University
- Doctoral advisor: William J. McGuire
- Other academic advisors: Arie W. Kruglanski

John Thomas Jost (born 1968) is an American social psychologist best known for his work on system justification theory and the psychology of political ideology.

== Education ==
Jost received his AB degree in Psychology and Human Development from Duke University (1989), where he studied with Irving E. Alexander, Philip R. Costanzo, David Goldstein, and Lynn Hasher, and his PhD in Social and Political Psychology from Yale University (1995), where he was the last doctoral student of Leonard Doob and William J. McGuire. He was also a doctoral student of Mahzarin R. Banaji and a postdoctoral trainee of Arie W. Kruglanski.

== Career ==
Since 2003, he has been on the faculty of New York University, where he is Professor of Psychology, Politics (Associated Appointment), Sociology (Affiliated Appointment), and Data Science (Affiliated Appointment). Jost is a member of numerous editorial boards and professional organizations and societies, and he was President of the International Society of Political Psychology. He is the Editor of a book series on Political Psychology for Oxford University Press and the Founding Field Chief Editor of Frontiers in Social Psychology. Jost has received honorary doctorates from the University of Buenos Aires in Argentina and the Eötvös Lorand University (ELTE) in Budapest, Hungary. He delivered the Aaron Wildavsky Lecture in the Goldman School of Public Policy at UC Berkeley in 2022 and was inducted into the American Academy of Political and Social Science in 2024 as the Inaugural James S. Jackson Fellow.

== Research ==
Jost has contributed extensively to the study of stereotyping, prejudice, intergroup relations, social justice, political psychology, and social media. In collaboration with Banaji, he proposed a theory of system justification processes in 1994, and in collaboration with Jack Glaser, Kruglanski, and Frank Sulloway he proposed a theory of political ideology as motivated social cognition in 2003.

His (2020) book A Theory of System Justification was a finalist for the PROSE Award for “Psychology and Applied Social Work” for excellence in scholarly publishing and has been translated and published in Italy, Japan, and South Korea. His (2021) book Left & Right: The Psychological Significance of a Political Distinction won the Juliette and Alexander George Outstanding Political Psychology Book Award, sponsored by the International Society of Political Psychology.

Jost's writings have been translated into several languages, including Spanish, Italian, French, Portuguese, German, Hungarian, Polish, Japanese, and Korean.

== Awards ==
Jost's awards include the following:

- 2024- James S. Jackson Fellow, American Academy of Political and Social Science (https://www.aapss.org/fellows/latest/)
- 2023- Kurt Lewin Award for Distinguished Research on Social Issues, Sponsored by Society for the Psychological Study of Social Issues (https://www.spssi.org/index.cfm?fuseaction=page.viewPage&pageID=2766&nodeID=1)
- 2022- Juliette and Alexander L. George Outstanding Political Psychology Book Award Sponsored by the International Society of Political Psychology, for Left & Right: The Psychological Significance of a Political Distinction (https://ispp.org/awards/george/)
- 2019 - Carol and Ed Diener Award to Recognize a Mid-Career Scholar Whose Work Has Added Substantially to the Body of Knowledge in Social Psychology, Sponsored by the Society for Personality and Social Psychology and the Foundation for Personality and Social Psychology (https://spsp.org/membership/awards/midcareer/diener-award-social-psychology)
- 2018 - Honoris Causa, University of Buenos Aires, Argentina
- 2017-2018 - G. Stanley Hall Award, Society for the Teaching of Psychology, American Psychological Association
- 2017 - “Top Psychology Professors on Twitter,” OnlineEducation.com (https://www.onlineeducation.com/features/connected-psychology-professors-on-twitter)
- 2015 - “Top ten article of the year on digital news and social media” (http://www.niemanlab.org/2015/12/investigating-the-network-the-top-10-articles-from-the-year-in-digital-news-and-social-media-research/)
- 2011 - Fellow, Society for Personality and Social Psychology
- 2010 – Society of Experimental Social Psychology: Career Trajectory Award
- 2007 - International Center for Cooperation and Conflict Resolution, Columbia University: Morton Deutsch Award for Distinguished Scholarly and Practical Contributions to Social Justice
- 2005 - International Society for Self and Identity: Outstanding Early Career Award
- 2004 – International Society of Political Psychology: Erik Erikson Early Career Award
- 2003 - Society for Personality and Social Psychology: Theoretical Innovation Award
- 1993, 2006, 2007 - Society for the Psychological Study of Social Issues: Gordon Allport Award

== Books ==
- Jost, J.T. (2021). Left & right: The psychological significance of a political distinction. New York: Oxford University Press. https://global.oup.com/academic/product/left-and-right-9780190858339?cc=us&lang=en&
- Jost, J.T. (2020). A theory of system justification. Cambridge, MA: Harvard University Press. https://www.hup.harvard.edu/catalog.php?isbn=9780674244658
- Jost, J.T., Kay, A.C., & Thorisdottir, H. (Eds.) (2009). Social and psychological bases of ideology and system justification. New York: Oxford University Press. http://www.oup.com/us/catalog/general/subject/Psychology/Social/?view=usa&ci=9780195320916
- Jost, J.T., Banaji, M.R., & Prentice, D. (Eds.) (2004). Perspectivism in social psychology: The yin and yang of scientific progress. [Festschrift in honor of William J. McGuire.] Washington, DC: APA Press. http://www.apa.org/books/4316009.html
- Jost, J.T., & Sidanius, J. (Eds.) (2004). Political psychology: Key readings. New York: Psychology Press/Taylor & Francis. https://web.archive.org/web/20050824200204/http://www.keyreadings.com/social/book.asp?ID=1841690694
- Jost, J.T., & Major, B. (Eds.) (2001). The psychology of legitimacy: Emerging perspectives on ideology, justice, and intergroup relations. New York: Cambridge University Press. https://web.archive.org/web/20071013040830/http://cup.org/titles/catalogue.asp?isbn=0521786991

== Major Articles ==
- Valtonen, J., Azevedo, F., & Jost, J.T. (2026). Economic system justification predicts stigmatization of mental illness in the United States. American Psychologist. https://psycnet.apa.org/doiLanding?doi=10.1037%2Famp0001688
- de Oliveira Santos, D., & Jost, J.T. (2024). Liberal-conservative asymmetries in anti-democratic tendencies are partly explained by psychological differences in a nationally representative U.S. sample. Communications Psychology, 2, 61. https://doi.org/10.1038/s44271-024-00096-3
- Jost, J.T. (2024). Both-sideology endangers democracy and social science. Journal of Social Issues, 80, 1138-1203. https://doi.org/10.1111/josi.12633
- Mason, K.A., Vlasceanu, M., & Jost, J.T. (2024). Effects of system-sanctioned framing on climate awareness and environmental action in the U.S. and beyond. Proceedings of the National Academy of Sciences. 121(38), e2405973121. https://doi.org/10.1073/pnas.2405973121
- Jost, J.T., Baldassarri, D., & Druckman, J. (2022). Cognitive-motivational mechanisms of political polarization in social-communicative contexts. Nature Reviews Psychology, 1, 560–576. https://doi.org/10.1038/s44159-022-00093-5
- van der Linden, S., Panagopoulos, C., Azevedo, F., & Jost, J.T. (2021). The paranoid style in American politics revisited: An ideological asymmetry in conspiratorial thinking. Political Psychology, 42, 23–51. https://doi.org/10.1111/pops.12681
- Goudarzi, S., Pliskin, R., Jost, J.T., & Knowles, E. (2020). Economic system justification predicts muted emotional responses to inequality. Nature Communications, 11, 383 (2020). https://doi.org/10.1038/s41467-019-14193-z
- Sterling, J., Jost, J.T., & Bonneau, R. (2020). Political psycholinguistics: A comprehensive analysis of the language habits of liberal and conservative social media users. Journal of Personality and Social Psychology, 118, 805–834.
- Jost, J.T. (2019a). A quarter century of system justification theory: Questions, answers, criticisms, and societal applications. British Journal of Social Psychology, 58, 263–314.
- Jost, J.T. (2019b). The IAT is dead, long live the IAT: Context-sensitive measures of implicit attitudes are indispensable to social and political psychology. Current Directions in Psychological Science, 28, 10–19.
- Nam, H.H., Jost, J.T., Kaggen, L., Campbell-Meiklejohn, D., & Van Bavel, J.J. (2018). Amygdala structure and the tendency to regard the social system as legitimate and desirable. Nature Human Behaviour, 2, 133–138.
- Jost, J.T. (2017). Ideological asymmetries and the essence of political psychology. Political Psychology, 38, 167–208.
- Hennes, E.P., Ruisch, B., Feygina, I., Monteiro, C., & Jost, J.T. (2016). Motivated recall in the service of the economic system: The case of anthropogenic climate change. Journal of Experimental Psychology: General, 145, 755–771.
- Jost, J.T. (2015). Resistance to change: A social psychological perspective. Social Research: An International Quarterly, 82, 607–636.
- Jost, J.T., Nam, H., Amodio, D., & Van Bavel, J.J. (2014). Political neuroscience: The beginning of a beautiful friendship. Advances in Political Psychology (Vol. 35, Supplement 1, pp. 3–42).
- Jost, J.T., & Kay, A.C. (2010). Social justice: History, theory, and research. In S.T. Fiske, D. Gilbert, & G. Lindzey (Eds.), Handbook of social psychology (5th edition, Vol. 2, pp. 1122–1165). Hoboken, NJ: Wiley.
- Jost, J.T., Federico, C.M., & Napier, J. L. (2009). Political ideology: Its structure, functions, and elective affinities. Annual Review of Psychology, 60, 307–337.
- Napier, J.L., & Jost, J.T. (2008). Why are conservatives happier than liberals? Psychological Science, 19, 565–572.
- Amodio, D.M., Jost, J.T., Master, S.L., & Yee, C.M. (2007). Neurocognitive correlates of liberalism and conservatism. Nature Neuroscience, 10, 1246–1247.
- Carney, D.R., Jost, J.T., Gosling, S.D., & Potter, J. (2008). The secret lives of liberals and conservatives: Personality profiles, interaction styles, and the things they leave behind. Political Psychology, 29, 807–840.
- Jost, J.T. (2006). The end of the end of ideology. American Psychologist, 61, 651–670.
- Jost, J.T., & Kay, A.C. (2005). Exposure to benevolent sexism and complementary gender stereotypes: Consequences for specific and diffuse forms of system justification. Journal of Personality and Social Psychology, 88, 498–509.
- Jost, J.T., Banaji, M.R., & Nosek, B.A. (2004). A decade of system justification theory: Accumulated evidence of conscious and unconscious bolstering of the status quo. Political Psychology, 25, 881–919.
- Jost, J.T., Glaser, J., Kruglanski, A.W., & Sulloway, F. (2003). Political conservatism as motivated social cognition. Psychological Bulletin, 129, 339–375.
- Jost, J.T., & Hunyady, O. (2003). The psychology of system justification and the palliative function of ideology. European Review of Social Psychology, 13, 111–153.
- Kay, A.C., & Jost, J.T. (2003). Complementary justice: Effects of “poor but happy” and “poor but honest” stereotype exemplars on system justification and implicit activation of the justice motive. Journal of Personality and Social Psychology, 85, 823–837.
- Jost, J.T., & Thompson, E.P. (2000). Group-based dominance and opposition to equality as independent predictors of self-esteem, ethnocentrism, and social policy attitudes among African Americans and European Americans. Journal of Experimental Social Psychology, 36, 209–232.
- Jost, J.T., & Banaji, M.R. (1994). The role of stereotyping in system-justification and the production of false consciousness. British Journal of Social Psychology, 33, 1-27.
