= McGuire's Motivations =

McGuire’s Psychological Motivations is a classification system that organizes theories of motives into 16 categories. The system helps marketers to isolate motives likely to be involved in various consumption situations.

== Categories ==
McGuire first divided the motivation into two main categories using two criteria:

1. Is the mode of motivation cognitive or affective?
2. Is the motive focused on preservation of the status quo or on growth?

Then for each division in each category he stated there is two more basic elements.

1. Is this behavior actively initiated or in response to the environment?
2. Does this behavior help the individual achieve a new internal or a new external relationship to the environment?

== Divisions of categories ==
1. Cognitive Preservation Motives
  a. Need for Consistency (active, internal)
  b. Need for Attribution (active, external)
  c. Need to categorize (passive, internal)
  d. Need for objectification (passive, external)
2. Cognitive Growth Motives
  a. Need for Autonomy (active, internal)
  b. Need for Stimulation (active, external)
  c. Teleological Need (passive, internal)
  d. Utilitarian Need (passive, external)
3. Affective Preservation Motives
  a. Need for Tension Reduction
  b. Need for Expression (active, external)
  c. Need for Ego Defense (passive, internal)
  d. Need for Reinforcement (passive, external)
4. Affective Growth Motives
  a. Need for Assertion (active, internal)
  b. Need for Affiliation (active, external)
  c. Need for Identification (passive, internal)
  d. Need for Modeling (passive, external)

== See also ==
- Inoculation theory
