= Misinformation =

Incorrect or misleading information

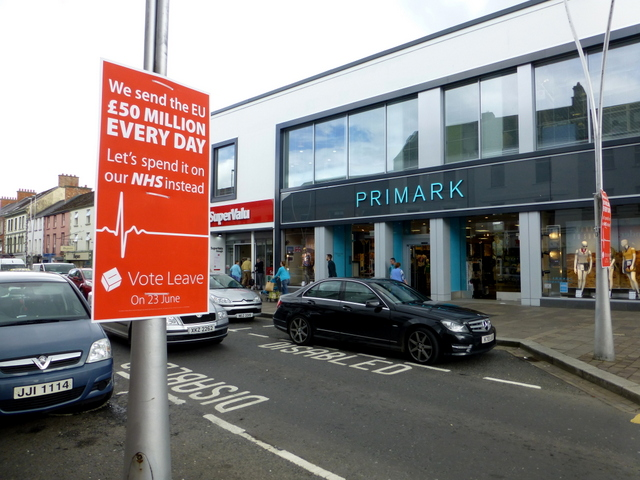
A sign for the successful campaign to leave in the 2016 United Kingdom European Union membership referendum. The claim made by the sign was widely considered to have been an example of misinformation.

Misinformation is incorrect or misleading information. Whereas misinformation can exist with or without specific malicious intent, disinformation is deliberately deceptive and intentionally propagated. Misinformation is typically spread unintentionally, mostly caused by a lack of knowledge, an error, or simply a misunderstanding, which contrasts with disinformation. Misinformation can include inaccurate, incomplete, misleading, or false information as well as selective or half-truths. Social media platforms, such as Facebook, Instagram, X, etc., are designed in ways that enable information, including misinformation, to be posted and shared far more quickly than through other communication mediums.

In January 2024, the World Economic Forum identified misinformation and disinformation, propagated by both internal and external interests, to "widen societal and political divides" as the most severe global risks in the short term. The reason is that misinformation can influence people's beliefs about communities, politics, medicine, and more. Research shows that several factors, including cognitive biases, emotional responses, social dynamics, and media literacy levels, can influence susceptibility to misinformation.

Policies and legal measures created to address misinformation and disinformation, in some contexts, can be applied to restrict journalistic work and limit political expression, as reported by UNESCO and other monitoring organizations. In some countries, anti-misinformation laws and policies have been used to reduce media freedom, which has even resulted in the imprisonment of journalists and editors. The 20 worst ranked countries for media freedom in 2026 are, in reverse order, Eritrea, North Korea, China, Iran, Saudi Arabia, Afghanistan, Vietnam, Turkmenistan, Russia, Azerbaijan, Bahrain, Egypt, Nicaragua, Djibouti, Myanmar, Belarus, Yemen, Türkiye, Iraq, Sudan, and Cuba.

The term came into wider recognition during the mid-1990s through the early 2020s, when its effects on public ideological influence began to be investigated. However, misinformation campaigns have existed for hundreds of years.

== Terminology ==
Scholars distinguish between misinformation, disinformation, and malinformation in terms of intent and effect. Misinformation is false or inaccurate information published without malicious intent, while disinformation is designed to mislead.

Malinformation is true information intended to cause harm, such as selectively publicizing a politician's personal information to shape public opinion.

Disinformation is created or spread by a person or organization actively attempting to deceive their audience. In addition to causing harm directly, disinformation can also cause indirect harm by undermining trust and obstructing the capacity to effectively communicate information with one another. Disinformation might consist of information that is partially or completely fabricated, taken out of context on purpose, exaggerated, or omits crucial details. Disinformation can appear in any medium including text, audio, and imagery. The distinction between mis- and dis-information can be muddy because the intent of someone sharing false information can be difficult to discern.

Misinformation is information that was originally thought to be true but was later discovered not to be true, and often applies to emerging situations in which there is a lack of verifiable information or changing scientific understanding. For example, the scientific guidance around infant sleep positions has evolved over time, and these changes could be a source of confusion for new parents. Misinformation can also often be observed as news events are unfolding and questionable or unverified information fills information gaps. Even if later retracted, false information can continue to influence actions and memory.

Rumors are unverified information not attributed to any particular source and may be either true or false.

Definitions of these terms may vary between cultural contexts.

== History ==
Early examples include the insults and smears spread among political rivals in Imperial and Renaissance Italy in the form of pasquinades. These are anonymous and witty verses named for the Pasquino piazza and talking statues in Rome. In pre-revolutionary France, "canards", or printed broadsides, sometimes included an engraving to convince readers to take them seriously.

During the summer of 1587, continental Europe anxiously awaited news as the Spanish Armada sailed to fight the English. The Spanish postmaster and Spanish agents in Rome promoted reports of Spanish victory in hopes of convincing Pope Sixtus V to release his promised one million ducats upon landing of troops. In France, the Spanish and English ambassadors promoted contradictory narratives in the press, and a Spanish victory was incorrectly celebrated in Paris, Prague, and Venice. It was not until late August that reliable reports of the Spanish defeat arrived in major cities and were widely believed; the remains of the fleet returned home in the autumn.

Misinformation has historically been linked to advancements in communications technologies. With the mass media revolution in the 20th century, television, radio, and newspapers were major vehicles for reliable information and misinformation. War-time propaganda, political disinformation, and corporate public relations operations often shaped the public perception, occasionally distorting facts to promote economic or ideological agendas. With the discovery of television as a popular medium, disinformation could be rapidly disseminated to millions of individuals, reinforcing existing bias and making correction more difficult. These early trends set the foundation for modern digital misinformation, which now spreads even more efficiently along internet networks.

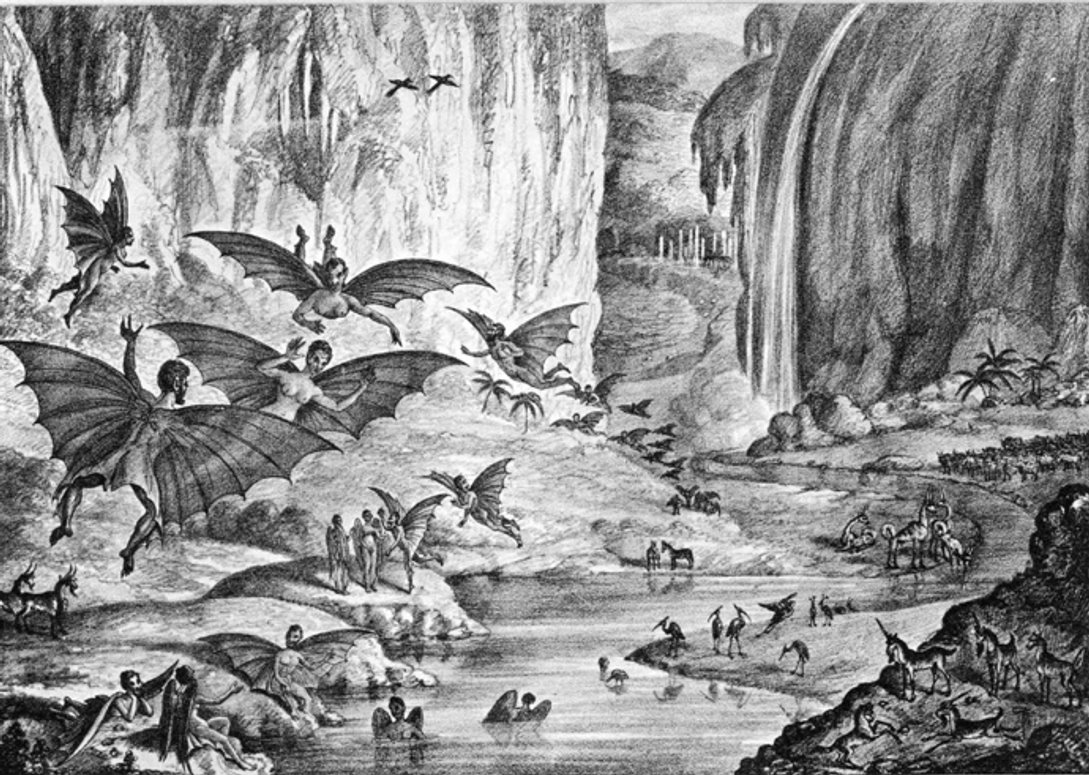
A lithograph from the first large scale spread of disinformation in America, the Great Moon Hoax

The first recorded large-scale disinformation campaign was the Great Moon Hoax, published in 1835 in the New York The Sun, in which a series of articles claimed to describe life on the Moon, "complete with illustrations of humanoid bat-creatures and bearded blue unicorns". The challenges of mass-producing news on a short deadline can lead to factual errors and mistakes. An example of such is the Chicago Tribune's 1948 headline "Dewey Defeats Truman", which was printed before Dewey's unexpected defeat was confirmed. In November 2005, Chris Hansen on Dateline NBC claimed that law enforcement officials estimate 50,000 predators are online at any moment. Afterward, then-U.S. attorney general Alberto Gonzales repeated the claim. However, the number that Hansen used in his reporting had no backing. Hansen said he received the information from Dateline expert Ken Lanning, but Lanning admitted that he made up the number 50,000 because there was no solid data on the number. According to Lanning, he used 50,000 because it sounds like a real number, not too big and not too small, and referred to it as a "Goldilocks number". Reporter Carl Bialik says that the number 50,000 is used often in the media to estimate numbers when reporters are unsure of the exact data.

Social media platforms allow for easy spread of misinformation, and misinformation was a major talking point during the 2016 U.S. presidential election with claims of social media sites allowing "fake news" to be spread. Post-election surveys in 2016 suggest that many individuals who intake false information on social media believe them to be factual. The specific reasons why misinformation spreads through social media so easily remain unknown. A 2018 study of Twitter determined that, compared to accurate information, false information spread significantly faster, further, deeper, and more broadly. Similarly, a research study of Facebook found that misinformation was more likely to be clicked on than factual information.

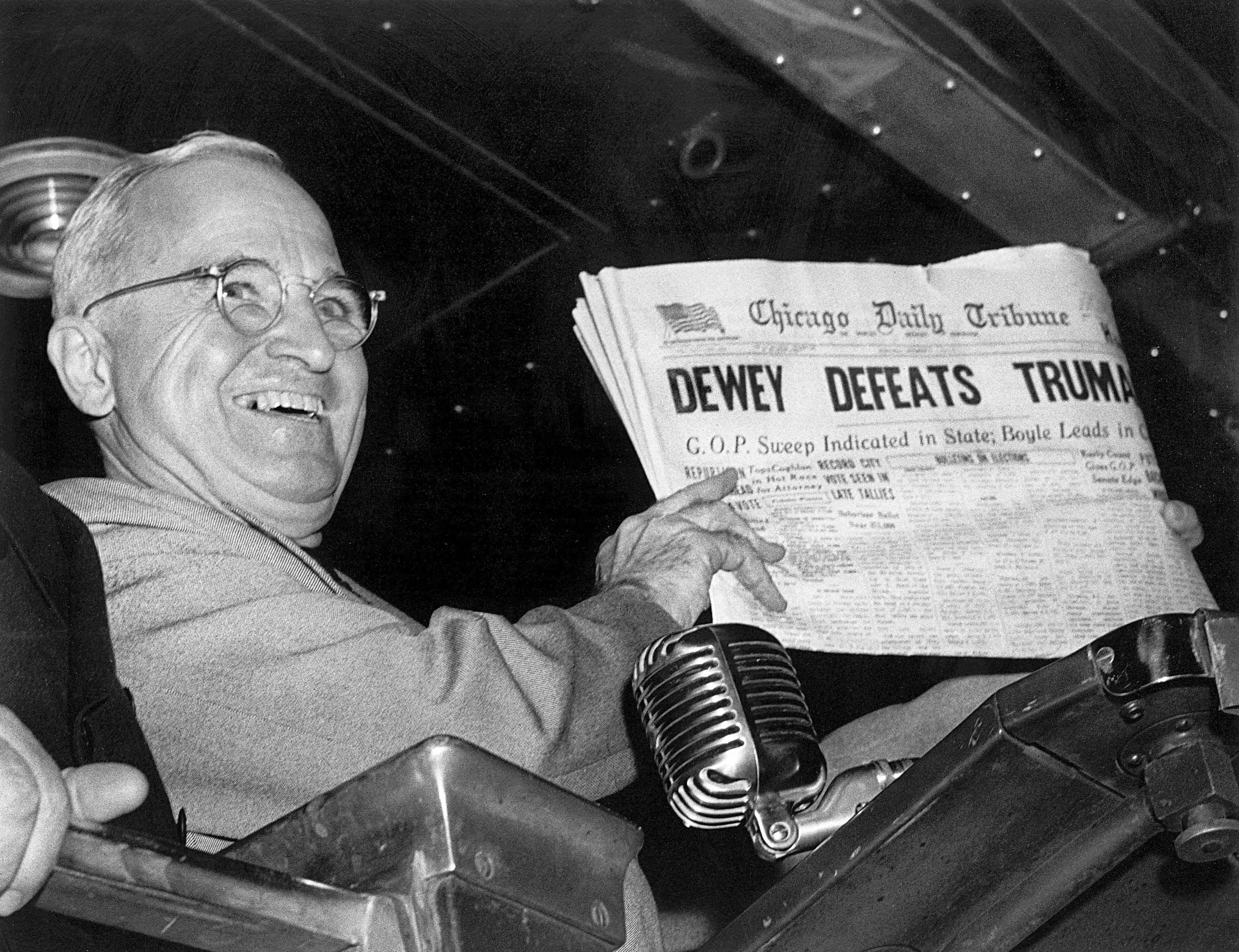
Harry S. Truman displaying the inaccurate Chicago Tribune headline, an example of misinformation

Moreover, the advent of the Internet has changed traditional ways that misinformation spreads. During the 2016 U.S. presidential election, content from websites deemed 'untrustworthy' reached up to 40% of Americans, despite misinformation making up only 6% of overall news media. Misinformation has been spread during many health crises. For example, misinformation about alternative treatments was spread during the Ebola outbreak in 2014–2016. During the COVID-19 pandemic, the proliferation of mis- and dis-information was exacerbated by a general lack of health literacy. For example, a conspiracy theory that COVID-19 was linked to the 5G network gained significant traction worldwide after emerging on social media.

=== COVID-19 misinformation ===
Misinformation is also a major public health problem, with effects on health behaviors. During the COVID-19 pandemic, social media was used as one of the main propagators of misinformation about symptoms, treatments, and long-term health-related problems, and caused people to make unsafe decisions, such as rejecting vaccines or ignoring public health guidelines, as reported by WHO (2020). This problem led to an effort in developing automated detection methods for misinformation on social media platforms.

A study conducted in the UK and the US found that exposure to recent COVID-19 vaccine misinformation significantly lowered vaccination intent, by 6.4 percentage points in the UK and 2.4 percentage points in the US, especially among people who originally planned to "definitely" vaccinate.

The creator of the Stop Mandatory Vaccination made money posting anti-vax false news on social media. He posted more than 150 posts aimed towards women, garnering a total of 1.6 million views and earning money for every click and share.

== Research ==
Much research on how to correct misinformation has focused on fact-checking. However, this can be challenging because the information deficit model does not necessarily apply well to beliefs in misinformation. Various researchers have also investigated what makes people susceptible to misinformation. People may be more prone to believe misinformation because they are emotionally connected to what they are listening to or are reading. Social media has made information readily available to society at anytime, and it connects vast groups of people along with their information at one time. Advances in technology have impacted the way people communicate information and the way misinformation is spread. Today, social media platforms are popular sites for news consumption, with over 50% of US adults reporting them as one method of their news consumption.

=== Causes ===
Factors that contribute to beliefs in misinformation are an ongoing subject of study. According to Scheufele and Krause, misinformation belief has roots at the individual, group and societal levels. At the individual level, individuals have varying levels of skill in recognizing mis- or dis-information and may be predisposed to certain misinformation beliefs due to other personal beliefs, motivations, or emotions. At the group level, in-group bias and a tendency to associate with like-minded or similar people can produce echo chambers and information silos that can create and reinforce misinformation beliefs. At the societal level, public figures like politicians and celebrities can disproportionately influence public opinions, as can mass media outlets. In addition, societal trends like political polarization, economic inequalities, declining trust in science, and changing perceptions of authority contribute to the impact of misinformation.

Disinformation has evolved and grown over the years, with the advent of online platforms, which facilitate the speed of transmission. Research indicates there is evidence to demonstrate that misinformation circulates at a faster rate than accurate facts, and to some degree due to the emotional and sensationalized presentation of the lie. Social media structures, which have been leveraged by politicians and news media for political and economic ends, have exacerbated the prevalence of misinformation. Historically, people have relied on journalists and other information professionals to relay facts. As the number and variety of information sources has increased, it has become more challenging for the general public to assess their credibility. This growth of consumer choice when it comes to news media allows the consumer to choose a news source that may align with their biases, which consequently increases the likelihood that they are misinformed. In 2017, 67% of US adults reported obtaining at least some of their news from social media, although many respondents also referenced traditional news sources. Polling shows that Americans trust mass media at record-low rates, and that US young adults place similar levels of trust in information from social media and from national news organizations. The pace of the 24 hour news cycle does not always allow for adequate fact-checking, potentially leading to the spread of misinformation. Further, the distinction between opinion and reporting can be unclear to viewers or readers. Sources of misinformation can appear highly convincing and similar to trusted legitimate sources. For example, misinformation cited with hyperlinks has been found to increase readers' trust. Trust is even higher when these hyperlinks are to scientific journals, and higher still when readers do not click on the sources to investigate for themselves. Research has also shown that the presence of relevant images alongside incorrect statements increases both their believability and shareability, even if the images do not actually provide evidence for the statements. For example, a false statement about macadamia nuts accompanied by an image of a bowl of macadamia nuts tends to be rated as more believable than the same statement without an image.

The translation of scientific research into popular reporting can also lead to confusion if it flattens nuance, sensationalizes the findings, or places too much emphasis on weaker levels of evidence. For instance, researchers have found that newspapers are more likely than scientific journals to cover observational studies and studies with weaker methodologies. Dramatic headlines may gain readers' attention, but they do not always accurately reflect scientific findings.

Human cognitive tendencies can also be a contributing factor to misinformation belief. One study found that an individual's recollection of political events could be altered when presented with misinformation about the event, even when primed to identify warning signs of misinformation. Misinformation may also be appealing by seeming novel or incorporating existing stereotypes.

=== Identification ===
Several strategies have been suggested to reduce misinformation. One approach is to evaluate source credibility and motivation of the source, as well as considering plausibility of claims. Readers tend to distinguish between unintentional misinformation and uncertain evidence from politically or financially motivated misinformation. The perception of misinformation depends on the political spectrum, with right-wing readers more concerned with attempts to hide reality. It can be difficult to undo the effects of misinformation once individuals believe it to be true. Individuals may desire to reach a certain conclusion, causing them to accept information that supports that conclusion, and are more likely to retain and share information if it emotionally resonates with them. The SIFT Method, also called the Four Moves, is one commonly taught method of distinguishing between reliable and unreliable information. This method instructs readers to first Stop and begin to ask themselves about what they are reading or viewing - do they know the source and if it is reliable? Second, readers should Investigate the source. What is the source's relevant expertise and do they have an agenda? Third, a reader should Find better coverage and look for reliable coverage on the claim at hand to understand if there is a consensus around the issue. Finally, a reader should Trace claims, quotes, or media to their original context: has important information been omitted, or is the original source questionable?

Visual misinformation presents particular challenges, but there are some effective strategies for identification. Misleading graphs and charts can be identified through careful examination of the data presentation; for example, truncated axes or poor color choices can cause confusion. Reverse image searching can reveal whether images have been taken out of their original context. There are currently some somewhat reliable ways to identify AI-generated imagery, but it is likely that this will become more difficult to identify as the technology advances.

A person's formal education level and media literacy do correlate with their ability to recognize misinformation. People who are familiar with a topic, the processes of researching and presenting information, or have critical evaluation skills are more likely to correctly identify misinformation. However, these are not always direct relationships. Higher overall literacy does not always lead to improved ability to detect misinformation. Context clues can also significantly impact people's ability to detect misinformation.

Martin Libicki, author of Conquest In Cyberspace: National Security and Information Warfare, notes that readers should aim to be skeptical but not cynical. Readers should not be gullible, believing everything they read without question, but also should not be paranoid that everything they see or read is false.

=== AI contribution to the problem and aid in combatting ===
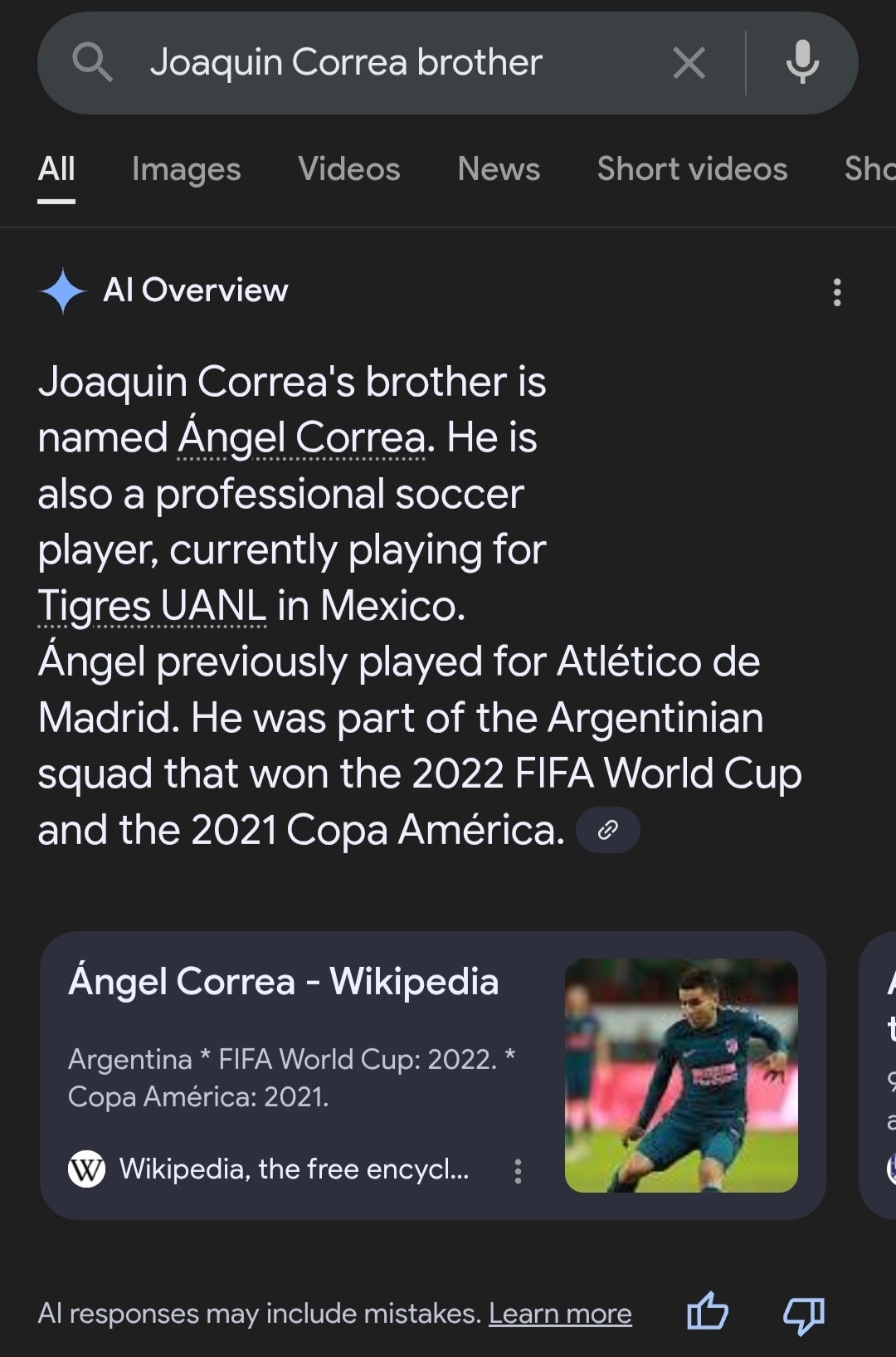
Google AI Overviews result in 10 August 2025 incorrectly stating that Joaquín Correa is the brother of Ángel Correa; the two are unrelated.

The rise of artificial intelligence (AI) has also contributed to the formation of new types of misinformation and disinformation. This is called Synthetic media according to the UNHCR Factsheet. AI is capable of manipulation and modification of data and multimedia. AI is used in algorithms nowadays to mislead audience. The presence of synthetic media could intensify fake news and supports the spread of misinformation if used in the wrong way. Deep fakes are a part of synthetic media that have gained popularity recently in which faces of people are replaced. This manipulation has garnered widespread attention for their use in fake news, hoaxes, fraud and revenge porn. Speech synthesis (Another type of synthetic media) amplifies these deep fakes by artificially producing human speech with the help of a speech computer. Synthetic media has become a concern for industries and governments which made some countries already have a national response or national institutions are working on detecting and limiting its use. However, AI also helps by contributing to the fight against misinformation.

- Deepfakes and Synthetic media create very convincing visual, audio, and textual evidence that is difficult to distinguish from legitimate authoritative evidence.
- Internet bots and automated Internet trolls can rapidly sow disinformation.
- Algorithmic bias plays a role in amplification of sensational and controversial material regardless of truth.

==== AI misinformation examples ====
===== LA wildfire Hollywood sign =====
In 2025, California experienced a firestorm disaster, accompanied by a massive wave of AI disinformation, which led to misinformation. An example of such misinformation is the AI-generated images of Hollywood Sign on fire. Jeff Zarrinnam, chairman of Hollywood Sign, said, "'They look so real that I couldn't tell if it was real or not,' he says. "'You know, if I didn't see the Hollywood Sign myself ... I would have probably believed' that it was on fire." The Hollywood sign was never on fire, but it led to multiple people contacting Jeff Zarrinnam asking if the sign was ok because they believed it to be burnt.

A Microsoft AI for Good Lab study ran a test. The test, which had 12,500 global participants, chose whether an image was "Real or Artificial". In total, 287,269 images were seen by participants; only 93,490 were real images. The Microsoft AI for Good Lab study found that participants had a 62% success rate in guessing correctly. The test shows how hard it is to detect AI-generated images.

===== Mata v. Avianca, Inc., =====
ChatGPT uses large language models (LLMs) to generate text from human data (books, articles, social media, etc). LLMs are known to generate false information, whether they got their information from a parody site like The Onion, people posting misinformation, or the LLMs just making up data aka hallucinating. An example of such LLM hallucinations is the court case of Roberto Mata, Plaintiff, v. Aviance Inc., Defendant, in which two attorneys defending Mata submitted an AI-generated legal motion that hallucinated court cases.

===== 8 December earthquake =====
On 8 December 2025, Japan experienced an earthquake disaster, accompanied by multiple AI-generated videos that emerged on social media. These AI-generated videos showed and explained how the earthquake began, what happened during it, and its aftermath. These AI-generated videos misinform the Japanese public, causing a government response warning of such fake videos.

===== Zelenskyy deepfakes =====
Hackers broadcast a deepfake video of Volodymyr Zelenskyy telling his soldiers to surrender in 2022. Zelenskyy later disproved the deepfake.

===== Brown University shooting =====
On 13 December 2025, there was a shooting at Brown University, where the gunman wore a mask. Multiple people on social media used AI-generated images to create a face for what the gunman would look like. AI cannot generate a real image of the gunman's face, which could lead to wrongful arrest when fake AI-generated faces are used.

== Countermeasures ==
Factors that contribute to the effectiveness of a corrective message include an individual's mental model or worldview, repeated exposure to the misinformation, time between misinformation and correction, credibility of the sources, and relative coherency of the misinformation and corrective message. Corrective messages will be more effective when they are coherent and/or consistent with the audience's worldview. They will be less effective when misinformation is believed to come from a credible source, is repeated prior to correction (even if the repetition occurs in the process of debunking), and/or when there is a time lag between the misinformation exposure and corrective message. Additionally, corrective messages delivered by the original source of the misinformation tend to be more effective. However, misinformation research has often been criticized for its emphasis on efficacy (i.e., demonstrating effects of interventions in controlled experiments) over effectiveness (i.e., confirming real-world impacts of these interventions). Critics argue that while laboratory settings may show promising results, these do not always translate into practical, everyday situations where misinformation spreads. Several challenges have been suggested in implementing interventions for misinformation: an overabundance of lab research and a lack of field studies, the presence of testing effects that impede intervention longevity and scalability, modest effects for small fractions of relevant audiences, reliance on item evaluation tasks as primary efficacy measures, low replicability in the Global South and a lack of audience-tailored interventions, and the underappreciation of potential unintended consequences of intervention implementation.

=== Fact-checking and debunking ===
Websites have been created to help people to discern fact from fiction. For example, the site FactCheck.org aims to fact check the media, especially viral political stories. The site also includes a forum where people can openly ask questions about the information. Similar sites allow individuals to copy and paste misinformation into a search engine and the site will investigate it. Some sites exist to address misinformation about specific topics, such as climate change misinformation. DeSmog, formerly The DeSmogBlog, publishes factually accurate information in order to counter the well-funded disinformation campaigns spread by motivated deniers of climate change. Science Feedback focuses on evaluating science, health, climate, and energy claims in the media and providing an evidence-based analysis of their veracity.

Flagging or eliminating false statements in media using algorithmic fact checkers is becoming an increasingly common tactic to fight misinformation. Google and many social media platforms have added automatic fact-checking programs to their sites and created the option for users to flag information that they think is false. Google provides supplemental information pointing to fact-checking websites in search results for controversial topics. On Facebook, algorithms may warn users if what they are about to share is likely false. In some cases social media platforms' efforts to curb the spread of misinformation has resulted in controversy, drawing criticism from people who see these efforts as constructing a barrier to their right to expression.

==== One-on-one correction ====
When it comes to personal interactions, some strategies for debunking misinformation have the potential to be effective. Simply delivering facts is frequently ineffective because misinformation belief is often not the result of a deficit of accurate information, although individuals may be more likely to change their beliefs in response to information shared by someone with whom they have close social ties, like a friend or family member. Other effective strategies focus on instilling doubt and encouraging people to examine the roots of their beliefs. In these situations, tone can also play a role: expressing empathy and understanding can keep communication channels open.

==== Social correction ====
Fact-checking and debunking can be done in one-on-one interactions, but when this occurs on social media it is likely that other people may encounter and read the interaction, potentially learning new information from it or examining their own beliefs. This type of correction has been termed social correction. Researchers have identified three ways to increase the efficacy of these social corrections for observers. First, corrections should include a link to a credible source of relevant information, like an expert organization. Second, the correct information should be repeated, for example at the beginning and end of the comment or response. Third, an alternative explanation should be offered. An effective social correction in response to a statement that chili peppers can cure COVID-19 might look something like: "Hot peppers in your food, though very tasty, cannot prevent or cure COVID-19. The best way to protect yourself against the new coronavirus is to keep at least 1 meter away from others and to wash your hands frequently and thoroughly. Adding peppers to your soup won't prevent or cure COVID-19. Learn more from the WHO." Interestingly, while the tone of the correction may impact how the target of the correction receives the message and can increase engagement with a message, it is less likely to affect how others seeing the correction perceive its accuracy.

While social correction has the potential to reach a wider audience with correct information, it can also potentially amplify an original post containing misinformation.

=== Prebunking ===
Misinformation typically spreads more readily than fact-checking. Further, even if misinformation is corrected, that does not mean it is forgotten or does not influence people's thoughts. Another approach, called prebunking, aims to "inoculate" against misinformation by showing people examples of misinformation and how it works before they encounter it. While prebunking can involve fact-based correction, it focuses more on identifying common logical fallacies (e.g., emotional appeals to manipulate individuals' perceptions and judgments, false dichotomies, or ad hominem fallacies) and tactics used to spread misinformation as well as common misinformation sources. Research about the efficacy of prebunking has shown promising results.

=== Other interventions ===
A report by the Royal Society in the UK lists additional potential or proposed countermeasures:

- Automated detection systems (e.g. to flag or add context and resources to content)
- Provenance enhancing technology (i.e. better enabling people to determine the veracity of a claim, image, or video)
- APIs for research (i.e. for usage to detect, understand, and counter misinformation)
- Active bystanders (e.g. corrective commenting)
- Community moderation (usually of unpaid and untrained, often independent, volunteers)
- Anti-virals (e.g. limiting the number of times a message can be forwarded in privacy-respecting encrypted chats)
- Collective intelligence (examples being Wikipedia where multiple editors refine encyclopedic articles, and question-and-answer sites where outputs are also evaluated by others similar to peer-review)
- Media literacy (increasing citizens' ability to use ICTs to find, evaluate, create, and communicate information, an essential skill for citizens of all ages)
  - Media literacy is taught in Estonian public schools – from kindergarten through to high school – since 2010 and "accepted 'as important as [...] writing or reading'"
  - New Jersey mandated K-12 students to learn information literacy
  - "Inoculation" via educational videos shown to adults is being explored

Broadly described, the report recommends building resilience to scientific misinformation and a healthy online information environment and not having offending content removed. It cautions that censorship could e.g. drive misinformation and associated communities "to harder-to-address corners of the internet".

Online misinformation about climate change can be counteracted through different measures at different stages. Prior to misinformation exposure, education and "inoculation" are proposed. Technological solutions, such as early detection of bots and ranking and selection algorithms are suggested as ongoing mechanisms. Post misinformation, corrective and collaborator messaging can be used to counter climate change misinformation. Incorporating fines and similar consequences has also been suggested.

The International Panel on the Information Environment was launched in 2023 as a consortium of over 250 scientists working to develop effective countermeasures to misinformation and other problems created by perverse incentives in organizations disseminating information via the Internet.

There also is research and development of platform-built-in as well as browser-integrated (currently in the form of addons) misinformation mitigation. This includes quality/neutrality/reliability ratings for news sources. Wikipedia's perennial sources page categorizes many large news sources by reliability. Researchers have also demonstrated the feasibility of falsity scores for popular and official figures by developing such for over 800 contemporary elites on Twitter as well as associated exposure scores.

Trust in institutions and sources tends to increase with political congruence or similarity. Politically distant sources increase the resistance to believing facts, while politically close sources increase susceptibility to misinformation. Strategies that may be more effective for lasting correction of false beliefs include focusing on intermediaries (such as convincing activists or politicians who are credible to the people who hold false beliefs, or promoting intermediaries who have the same identities or worldviews as the intended audience), minimizing the association of misinformation with political or group identities (such as providing corrections from nonpartisan experts, or avoiding false balance based on partisanship in news coverage), and emphasizing corrections that are hard for people to avoid or deny (such as providing information that the economy is unusually strong or weak, or describing the increased occurrence of extreme weather events in response to climate change denial).

=== AI as a tool to combat misinformation ===
- Fact-checking algorithms are employed to fact-check truth claims in real-time.
- Researchers are developing AI tools for detecting fabricated audio and video.
- AI can be used for Information literacy and Media literacy education.

=== Limitations ===
Interventions need to account for the possibility that misinformation can persist in the population even after corrections are published. Possible reasons include difficulty in reaching the right people and corrections not having long-term effects. For example, if corrective information is only published in science-focused publications and fact-checking websites, it may not reach the people who believe in misinformation since they are less likely to read those sources. In addition, successful corrections may not be persistent, particularly if people are re-exposed to misinformation at a later date.

It has been suggested that directly countering misinformation can be counterproductive, which is referred to as a "backfire effect", but in practice this is very rare. A 2020 review of the scientific literature on backfire effects found that there have been widespread failures to replicate their existence, even under conditions that would be theoretically favorable to observing them. Due to the lack of reproducibility, as of 2020 most researchers believe that backfire effects are either unlikely to occur on the broader population level, or they only occur in very specific circumstances, or they do not exist. Brendan Nyhan, one of the researchers who initially proposed the occurrence of backfire effects, wrote in 2021 that the persistence of misinformation is most likely due to other factors. For most people, corrections and fact-checking are very unlikely to have a negative impact, and there is no specific group of people in which backfire effects have been consistently observed. In many cases, when backfire effects have been discussed by the media or by bloggers, they have been overgeneralized from studies on specific subgroups to incorrectly conclude that backfire effects apply to the entire population and to all attempts at correction.

== Online misinformation ==
In recent years, the proliferation of misinformation online has drawn widespread attention. More than half of the world's population had access to the Internet in the beginning of 2018. Digital and social media can contribute to the spread of misinformation – for instance, when users share information without first checking the legitimacy of the information they have found. People are more likely to encounter online information based on personalized algorithms. Google, Facebook and Yahoo News all generate newsfeeds based on the information they know about our devices, our location, and our online interests.

Although two people can search for the same thing at the same time, they are very likely to get different results based on what that platform deems relevant to their interests, fact or false. Various social media platforms have recently been criticized for encouraging the spread of false information, such as hoaxes, false news, and mistruths. It is responsible with influencing people's attitudes and judgment during significant events by disseminating widely believed misinformation. Furthermore, online misinformation can occur in numerous ways, including rumors, urban legends, factoids, etc. However, the underlying factor is that it contains misleading or inaccurate information.

Moreover, users of social media platforms may experience intensely negative feelings, perplexity, and worry as a result of the spread of false information. According to a recent study, one in ten Americans has gone through mental or emotional stress as a result of misleading information posted online. Spreading false information can also seriously impede the effective and efficient use of the information available on social media. An emerging trend in the online information environment is "a shift away from public discourse to private, more ephemeral, messaging", which is a challenge to counter misinformation.

=== On social media ===
Pew Research reports shared that approximately one in four American adults admitted to sharing misinformation on their social media platforms.

In the Information Age, social networking sites have become a notable agent for the spread of misinformation, fake news, and propaganda. Social media sites have changed their algorithms to prevent the spread of fake news but the problem still exists.

Image posts are the biggest spread of misinformation on social media, a fact which is grossly unrepresented in research. This leads to a "yawning gap of knowledge" as there is a collective ignorance on how harmful image-based posts are compared to other types of misinformation.

==== Spread ====
Social media platforms allow for easy spread of misinformation. Reasons for sharing misinformation on social media are varied, which can include presenting a conversation topic, finding the content interesting, and expressing an opinion. Agent-based models and other computational models have been used by researchers to explain how false beliefs spread through networks. Epistemic network analysis is one example of a computational method for evaluating connections in data shared in a social media network or similar network.

Researchers fear that misinformation in social media is "becoming unstoppable". It has also been observed that misinformation and disinformation reappear on social media sites.

Misinformation spread by bots has been difficult for social media platforms to address. Sites such as Facebook have algorithms that have been proven to further the spread of misinformation in which how content is spread among subgroups.

==== Social causes and echo chambers ====
Spontaneous spread of misinformation on social media usually occurs from users sharing posts from friends or mutually-followed pages. These posts are often shared from someone the sharer believes they can trust. Misinformation introduced through a social format influences individuals drastically more than misinformation delivered non-socially.

People are inclined to follow or support like-minded individuals, creating echo chambers and filter bubbles. Untruths or general agreement within isolated social clusters are difficult to counter. Some argue this causes an absence of a collective reality. Research has also shown that viral misinformation may spread more widely as a result of echo chambers, as the echo chambers provide an initial seed which can fuel broader viral diffusion.

Misinformation might be created and spread with malicious intent for reasons such as causing anxiety or deceiving audiences. Computational Propaganda actors benefit from both disinformation and misinformation. Rumors created with or without malicious intent may be unknowingly shared by users. People may know what the scientific community has proved as a fact, and still refuse to accept it as such.

==== Lack of regulation ====
Misinformation on social media spreads quickly in comparison to traditional media because of the lack of regulation and examination required before posting. This lack of regulation creates an environment where speed is prioritized over accuracy on social media. Because editorial oversight is not required, inaccurate or misleading posts can circulate widely before any fact-checkers or experts even become aware of them.

Social media sites provide users with the capability to spread information quickly to other users without requiring the permission of a gatekeeper such as an editor or fact checker. The architecture of social platforms intensifies this issue, with features such as algorithmic amplification—which prioritizes highly emotional or engaging content—boosting the spread of misinformation because sensational and catching posts perform better.

The problem of misinformation in social media is getting worse as younger generations prefer social media over journalistic for their source of information.

==== Lack of peer review ====
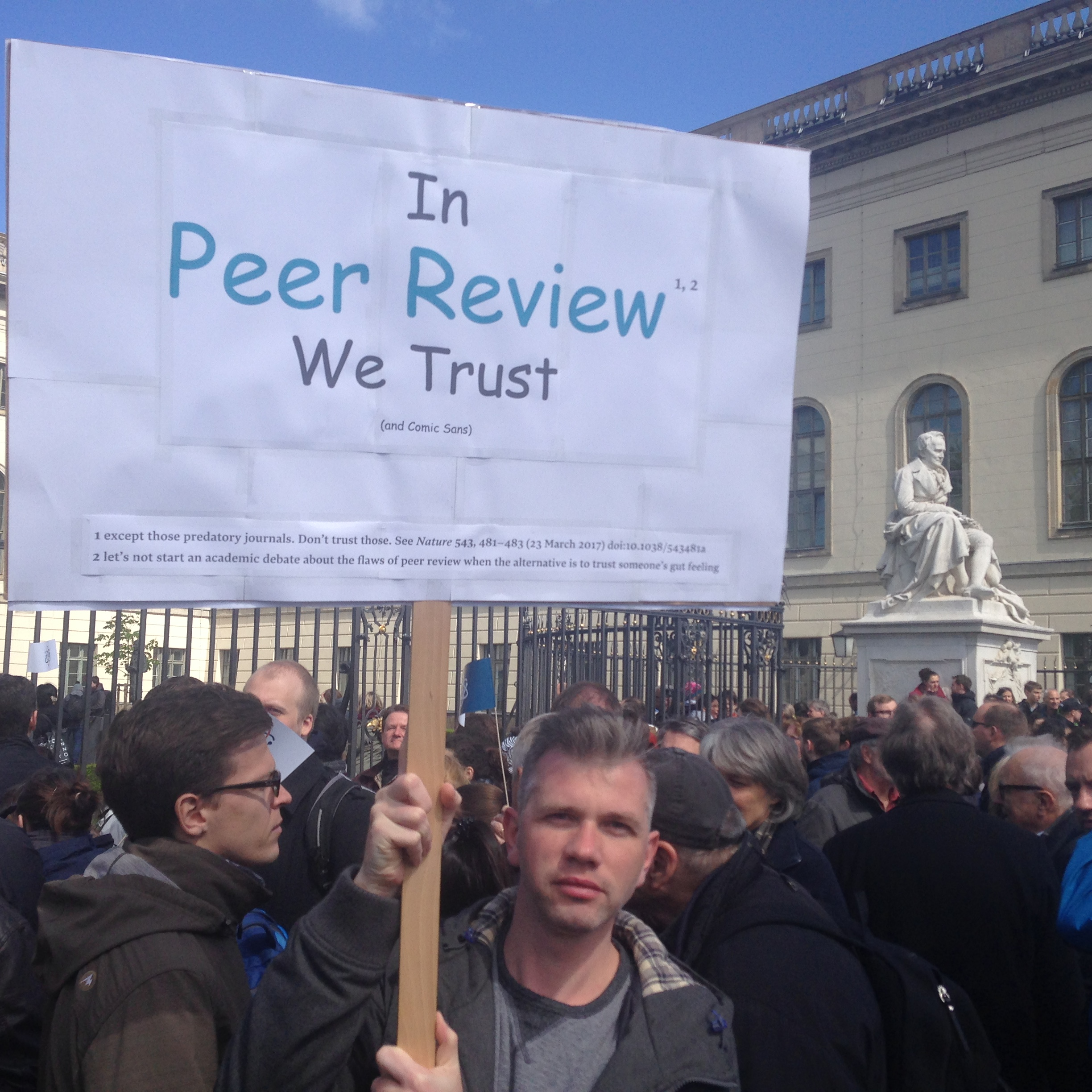
Promoting more peer review to benefit the accuracy in information

Due to the decentralized nature and structure of the Internet, content creators can easily publish content without being required to undergo peer review, prove their qualifications, or provide backup documentation. While library books have generally been reviewed and edited by an editor, publishing company, etc., Internet sources cannot be assumed to be vetted by anyone other than their authors. Misinformation may be produced, reproduced, and posted immediately on most online platforms.

==== Countermeasures ====
Combating the spread of misinformation on social media is difficult for reasons such as:

- The profusion of misinformation sources makes the reader's task of weighing the reliability of information more challenging.
- Social media's propensity for culture wars embeds misinformation with identity-based conflict.
- The proliferation of echo chambers form an epistemic environment in which participants encounter beliefs and opinions that coincide with their own, moving the entire group toward more extreme positions.

With the large audiences that can be reached and the experts on various subjects on social media, some believe social media could also be the key to correcting misinformation.

Journalists today are criticized for helping to spread false information on these social platforms, but research shows they also play a role in curbing it through debunking and denying false rumors.

=== By platform ===
==== Misinformation on TikTok ====
A research report by NewsGuard found there is a very high level (~20% in their probes of videos about relevant topics) of online misinformation delivered – to a mainly young user base – with TikTok, whose (essentially unregulated) usage is increasing as of 2022. TikTok's design also plays a role in how quickly misleading information can spread. Because the app centers short, fast-moving videos, people often scroll without pausing to fact-check what they are watching. Content that feels personal or relatable can seem trustworthy even when it is not, which makes false claims easier to believe and share. Researchers have noted that this casual style of communication—combined with TikTok's fast-paced feed—creates an environment where emotionally charged or sensational posts gain attention quickly, even if the information is inaccurate.

Several misinformation trends have gone viral on TikTok, including false COVID-19 cure claims, political rumors, fabricated crisis updates, and misleading safety warnings. During the pandemic, TikTok was widely criticized for videos promoting unproven home remedies and conspiracy theories. Other examples include viral hoaxes such as fake school threats and exaggerated weather alerts, which spread quickly because users tend to share alarming content without verifying it.

Medical Misinformation has also extended beyond COVID-19 related claims. In 2025, a study described a viral TikTok that received approximately 10.7 million views for sharing a video that linked a prolactinoma (a type of pituitary tumor) to a contraceptive device. Despite the lack of scientific evidence supporting this connection, the video still attracted widespread attention.

TikTok's recommendation system is designed to prioritize content based on engagement, which can unintentionally elevate misleading or false claims. A 2022 investigation by the Center for Countering Digital Hate found that TikTok recommended misinformation within minutes of creating new accounts, including content related to public health and political events. Scholars note that because the algorithm optimizes for watch time and interaction, posts containing misinformation can be amplified even without coordinated manipulation.

==== Misinformation on Facebook ====
A research study of Facebook found that misinformation was more likely to be clicked on than factual information. The most common reasons that Facebook users were sharing misinformation for socially-motivated reasons, rather than taking the information seriously.

Facebook's coverage of misinformation has become a hot topic with the spread of COVID-19, as some reports indicated Facebook recommended pages containing health misinformation. For example, this can be seen when a user likes an anti-vax Facebook page. Automatically, more and more anti-vax pages are recommended to the user. Additionally, some reference Facebook's inconsistent censorship of misinformation leading to deaths from COVID-19.

Facebook estimated the existence of up to 60 million troll bots actively spreading misinformation on their platform, and has taken measures to stop the spread of misinformation, resulting in a decrease, though misinformation continues to exist on the platform. On Facebook, adults older than 65 were seven times more likely to share fake news than adults ages 18–29.

==== Misinformation on Twitter ====
Twitter is one of the most concentrated platforms for engagement with political fake news. 80% of fake news sources are shared by 0.1% of users, who are "super-sharers". Older, more conservative social users are also more likely to interact with fake news. Another source of misinformation on Twitter are bot accounts, especially surrounding climate change. Bot accounts on Twitter accelerate true and fake news at the same rate. A 2018 study of Twitter determined that, compared to accurate information, false information spread significantly faster, further, deeper, and more broadly. A research study watched the process of thirteen rumors appearing on Twitter and noticed that eleven of those same stories resurfaced multiple times, after time had passed.

A social media app called Parler has caused much chaos as well. Right winged Twitter users who were banned on the app moved to Parler after the January 6 United States Capitol attack, and the app was being used to plan and facilitate more illegal and dangerous activities. Google and Apple later pulled the app off their respective app stores. This app has been able to cause a lot of misinformation and bias in the media, allowing for more political mishaps.

==== Misinformation on Telegram ====
Telegram has been accused multiple times of facilitating the creation and spread of misinformation online, partly due to its deregulation and lack of fact-checking tools.

==== Misinformation on YouTube ====
Anti-intellectual beliefs flourish on YouTube. One well-publicized example is the network of content creators supporting the view that the Earth is flat, not a sphere. Researchers found that the YouTubers publishing "Flat Earth" content aim to polarize their audiences through arguments that build upon an anti-scientific narrative.

A study published in July 2019 concluded that most climate change-related videos support worldviews that are opposed to the scientific consensus on climate change. Though YouTube claimed in December 2019 that new recommendation policies reduced "borderline" recommendations by 70%, a January 2020 Avaaz study found that, for videos retrieved by the search terms "climate change", "global warming", and "climate manipulation", YouTube's "up next" sidebar presented videos containing information contradicting the scientific consensus 8%, 16% and 21% of the time, respectively. Avaaz argued that this "misinformation rabbit hole" means YouTube helps to spread climate denialism, and profits from it.

In November 2020, YouTube issued a one-week suspension of the account of One America News Network and permanently de-monetized its videos because of OANN's repeated violations of YouTube's policy prohibiting videos claiming sham cures for COVID-19. Without evidence, OANN also cast doubt on the validity of the 2020 U.S. presidential election.

On August 1, 2021, YouTube barred Sky News Australia from uploading new content for a week for breaking YouTube's rules on spreading COVID-19 misinformation. In September 2021, more than a year after YouTube said it would take down misinformation about the coronavirus vaccines, the accounts of six out of twelve anti-vaccine activists identified by the nonprofit Center for Countering Digital Hate were still searchable and still posting videos.

In October 2021, YouTube's owner Google announced it would no longer permit YouTube creators to earn advertising money for content that "contradicts well-established scientific consensus around the existence and causes of climate change", and that it will not allow ads that promote such views. In spite of this policy, many videos that included misinformation about climate change were not de-monetized. Earlier, climate change deniers' online YouTube content focused on denying global warming, or saying such warming is not caused by humans burning fossil fuel. As such denials became untenable, using new tactics that evade YouTube's policies to combat misinformation, content shifted to asserting that climate solutions are not workable, saying global warming is harmless or even beneficial, and accusing the environmental movement of being unreliable.

== Impact ==
=== Trust of other information ===
The Liar's Dividend describes a situation in which individuals are so concerned about realistic misinformation (in particular, deepfakes) that they begin to mistrust real content, particularly if someone claims that it is false. For instance, a politician could benefit from claiming that a real video of them doing something embarrassing was actually AI-generated or altered, leading followers to mistrust something that was actually real. On a larger scale this problem can lead to erosion in the public's trust of generally reliable information sources.

Misinformation can affect all aspects of life. Allcott, Gentzkow, and Yu concur that the diffusion of misinformation through social media is a potential threat to democracy and broader society. The effects of misinformation can lead to decline of accuracy of information as well as event details. When eavesdropping on conversations, one can gather facts that may not always be true, or the receiver may hear the message incorrectly and spread the information to others. On the Internet, one can read content that is stated to be factual but that may not have been checked or may be erroneous. In the news, companies may emphasize the speed at which they receive and send information but may not always be correct in the facts. These developments contribute to the way misinformation may continue to complicate the public's understanding of issues and to serve as a source for belief and attitude formation.

=== Politics ===
Some view being a politically misinformed citizen as worse than being an uninformed one. Misinformed citizens can state their beliefs and opinions with confidence and thus affect elections and policies. This type of misinformation occurs when a speaker appears "authoritative and legitimate", while also spreading misinformation. When information is presented as vague, ambiguous, sarcastic, or partial, receivers are forced to piece the information together and make assumptions about what is correct. Misinformation has the power to sway public elections and referendums if it gains enough momentum. Leading up to the 2016 UK European Union membership referendum, for example, a figure used prominently by the Vote Leave campaign claimed that by leaving the EU, the UK would save £350 million a week, which could be spent on the British National Health Service after Brexit. This was later deemed a "clear misuse of official statistics" by the UK statistics authority.

Moreover, the advert did not take into account the UK's budget rebate, and the idea that 100% of the money saved would go to the NHS was unrealistic. A poll published in 2016 by Ipsos MORI found that nearly half of the British public believed this misinformation to be true. Even when information is proven to be misinformation, it may continue to shape attitudes towards a given topic, meaning it has the power to swing political decisions if it gains enough traction. A study conducted by Soroush Vosoughi, Deb Roy and Sinan Aral looked at Twitter data including 126,000 posts spread by 3 million people over 4.5 million times. They found that political news traveled faster than any other type of information. They found that false news about politics reached more than 20,000 people three times faster than all other types of false news.

=== Industry ===
Misinformation can also be employed in industrial propaganda. Using tools such as advertising, a company can undermine reliable evidence or influence belief through a concerted misinformation campaign. For instance, tobacco companies employed misinformation in the second half of the twentieth century to diminish the reliability of studies that demonstrated the link between smoking and lung cancer.

=== Medicine ===
In the medical field, misinformation can immediately lead to life endangerment as seen in the case of the public's negative perception towards vaccines or the use of herbs instead of medicines to treat diseases. In regards to the COVID-19 pandemic, the spread of misinformation has proven to cause confusion as well as negative emotions such as anxiety and fear. Misinformation regarding proper safety measures for the prevention of the virus that go against information from legitimate institutions like the World Health Organization can also lead to inadequate protection and possibly place individuals at risk for exposure.

=== Study ===
Some scholars and activists are heading movements to eliminate the mis/disinformation and information pollution in the digital world. The general study of misinformation and disinformation is by now also common across various academic disciplines, including sociology, communication, computer science, and political science.

Various scholars and journalists have criticised this development, pointing to problematic normative assumptions, a varying quality of output and lack of methodological rigor, as well as a too strong impact of mis- and disinformation research in shaping public opinion and policymaking. Summarising the most frequent points of critique, communication scholars Chico Camargo and Felix Simon wrote in an article for the Harvard Kennedy School Misinformation Review that "mis-/disinformation studies has been accused of lacking clear definitions, having a simplified understanding of what it studies, a too great emphasis on media effects, a neglect of intersectional factors, an outsized influence of funding bodies and policymakers on the research agenda of the field, and an outsized impact of the field on policy and policymaking."

== Censorship accusations ==
Social media sites such as Facebook and Twitter have found themselves defending accusations of censorship for removing posts they have deemed to be misinformation. Social media censorship policies relying on government agency-issued guidance to determine information validity have garnered criticism that such policies have the unintended effect of stifling dissent and criticism of government positions and policies. Most recently, social media companies have faced criticism over allegedly prematurely censoring the discussion of the SARS-CoV 2 Lab Leak Hypothesis.

Other accusations of censorship appear to stem from attempts to prevent social media consumers from self-harm through the use of unproven COVID-19 treatments. For example, in July 2020, a video went viral showing Dr. Stella Immanuel claiming hydroxychloroquine was an effective cure for COVID-19. In the video, Immanuel suggested that there was no need for masks, school closures, or any kind of economic shut down, attesting that her alleged cure was highly effective in treating those infected with the virus. The video was shared 600,000 times and received nearly 20 million views on Facebook before it was taken down for violating community guidelines on spreading misinformation. The video was also taken down on Twitter overnight, but not before former president Donald Trump shared it on his page, which was followed by over 85 million Twitter users. NIAID director Dr. Anthony Fauci and members of the World Health Organization (WHO) quickly discredited the video, citing larger-scale studies of hydroxychloroquine showing it is not an effective treatment of COVID-19, and the FDA cautioned against using it to treat COVID-19 patients following evidence of serious heart problems arising in patients who have taken the drug.

Another prominent example of misinformation removal criticized by some as an example of censorship was the New York Post's report on the Hunter Biden laptops approximately two weeks before the 2020 presidential election, which was used to promote the Biden–Ukraine conspiracy theory. Social media companies quickly removed this report, and the Post's Twitter account was temporarily suspended. Over 50 intelligence officials found the disclosure of emails allegedly belonging to Joe Biden's son had all the "classic earmarks of a Russian information operation". Later evidence emerged that at least some of the laptop's contents were authentic.

== See also ==
- List of common misconceptions
- List of fact-checking websites
- List of fake news websites
- List of satirical news websites
- Alarmism
- Artificial intelligence and elections
- Big lie
- Character assassination
  - Defamation (also known as "slander")
- Counter Misinformation Team
- COVID-19 misinformation
- 2026 French student protest disinformation
- Disinformation
- Disinformation attack
- Disinformation research
- Euromyth
- Factoid
- Fallacy
  - List of fallacies
- False balance
- Fear, uncertainty, and doubt
- Flat earth
- Gossip
- Junk science
- Memetic warfare
- Memory conformity
- Misinformation related to abortion
- Misinformation related to 5G technology
- Persuasion
- Post-truth
- Pseudoscience
- Quotation
- Rumor
- Sensationalism
- Social engineering (in political science and cybercrime)
- The Disinformation Project
- Truth sandwich
- Underlying theories of misinformation
