= Liar's dividend =

Political tactic

The liar's dividend is a political and media phenomenon in which public figures falsely claim that factual reporting is missing information, "fake news", or artificially generated in order to avoid accountability. This concept has been studied in political science to understand how such claims can allow politicians to maintain public support following scandals or controversial statements. This tactic leverages public uncertainty about the accuracy of information and can mobilize parties and supporters. It often takes advantage of emerging technology, such as AI–generated content and deepfakes, which makes distinguishing authentic material from manipulated material more difficult.

== History ==
The term "liar's dividend" was coined by legal scholars Bobby Chesney and Danielle Citron to describe the phenomenon in which the existence of realistic deepfakes can make people skeptical of genuine information.

The rise of AI and deepfake technology has increased the ability to produce highly convincing, manipulated media, making it easier to mislead viewers. In September 2023, an audio clip of Michal Šimečka, a politician from the Progressive Slovakia party, circulated online, allegedly showing him discussing election manipulation with a journalist. A YouGov poll found that 85% of respondents were "very concerned" about the spread of misleading deepfakes. Deepfakes of U.S. presidents Joe Biden and Donald Trump have also been widely circulated The "liar's dividend" has also been discussed in The New York Times in connection with AI-generated videos during the 2026 Iran war; the proliferation of such videos has led to the erroneous identification of real videos, such as one from Israeli prime minister Benjamin Netanyahu, as fake.

== Proposed mitigation ==
Josh A. Goldstein and Andrew Lohn, research fellows at the Center for Security and Emerging Technology (CEST) propose ways that the liar's dividend can be mitigated. Such methods include improved AI-detection technology, enhanced ability of the public to discern false claims of artificiality, more care by media outlets to avoid accidentally publishing deepfakes, and increased public backlash against false claims to hold liars more accountable.

== Examples ==
- Tesla lawyers argued that Elon Musk's past statements about the safety of self-driving cars could not be used in court because they were alleged deepfakes.
- In the aftermath of the January 6 Capitol riots, Guy Reffitt was charged with bringing a handgun to the Capitol building. His lawyer argued that evidence against him might be AI-generated.
- In 2025 a study conducted by the American Science Review tested the liar’s dividend on 15,287 people. Participants read or watch scandals from real politicians. They then say a rebuttal by the same politician that falsely claimed the story was misinformation. The rebuttals to text based scandals was effective and led to increased support for the politicians of around 0.17 to 0.21 standard deviations. Video based rebuttals were less effective. The rebuttal claims produced larger gains than staying silent or apologizing, and it did not reduce general trust in the media.

== See also ==
- Brandolini's law
- Firehose of falsehood
