= William J. McGuire =

American social psychologist (1925–2007)

- Born: February 17, 1925; New York City, New York
- Died: December 21, 2007 (aged 82); New Haven, Connecticut
- Education: Fordham College; Université catholique de Louvain; Yale University
- Known for: Persuasion; Social cognition
- Awards: Fulbright Fellow (1950–51); Fellow of eight divisions of the American Psychological Association; APA Award for Distinguished Scientific Contributions to Psychology (1988); Distinguished Scientist Award from the American Psychological Society (1992)
- Scientific career
- Fields: Social psychology
- Workplaces: Columbia University; University of California, San Diego; University of Illinois; Yale University
- Thesis: A multi-process model for paired associates learning (1954)
- Notable students: John Jost; David O. Sears

William James McGuire (February 17, 1925 in New York City, New York – December 21, 2007 in New Haven, Connecticut) was an American social psychologist known for his work on the psychology of persuasion and for developing Inoculation theory. He was a faculty member at Yale University from 1970 until he retired in 1999, and chaired the psychology department there from 1971 to 1973. He was the editor-in-chief of the Journal of Personality and Social Psychology from 1967 to 1970.

== Book ==
- Constructing Social Psychology: Creative and Critical Aspects, Cambridge University Press, 1999.

== Legacy ==
An obituary of McGuire in American Psychologist stated that McGuire was "for several decades the field’s premier researcher of the psychology of persuasion".
