= Objection (argument) =

Reason arguing against a premise, argument, or conclusion; expression of disagreement

In argumentation, an objection is a reason arguing against a premise, argument, or conclusion. Definitions of objection vary in whether an objection is always an argument (or counterargument) or may include other moves such as questioning.

An objection to an objection is sometimes known as a rebuttal.

An objection can be issued against an argument retroactively from the point of reference of that argument. This form of objection – invented by the presocratic philosopher Parmenides – is commonly referred to as a retroactive refutation.

== Inference objection ==
An inference objection is an objection to an argument based not on any of its stated premises, but rather on the relationship between a premise (or set of premises) and main contention. For a given simple argument, if the assumption is made that its premises are correct, fault may be found in the progression from these to the conclusion of the argument. This can often take the form of an unstated co-premise, as in begging the question. In other words, it may be necessary to make an assumption in order to conclude anything from a set of true statements. This assumption must also be true in order that the conclusion follow logically from the initial statements.

In the first example argument map shown below, the objector cannot find anything contentious in the stated premises of the argument, but still disagrees with the conclusion; the objection is therefore placed beside the main premise and, in this case, exactly corresponds to an unstated or 'hidden' co-premise. This is demonstrated by the second example argument map shown, in which the full pattern of reasoning relating to the contention is set out.

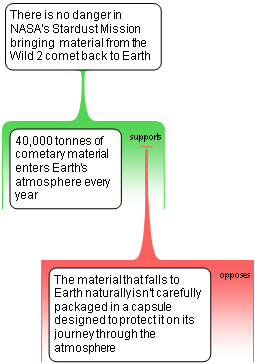
An example of an inference objection based on NASA's Stardust Mission

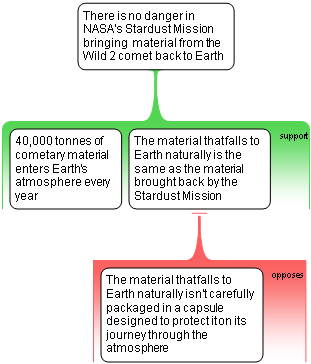
The same argument with the originally unstated co-premise included

== See also ==
- Argument map
- Defeater
