= Counterargument =

Rhetoric response

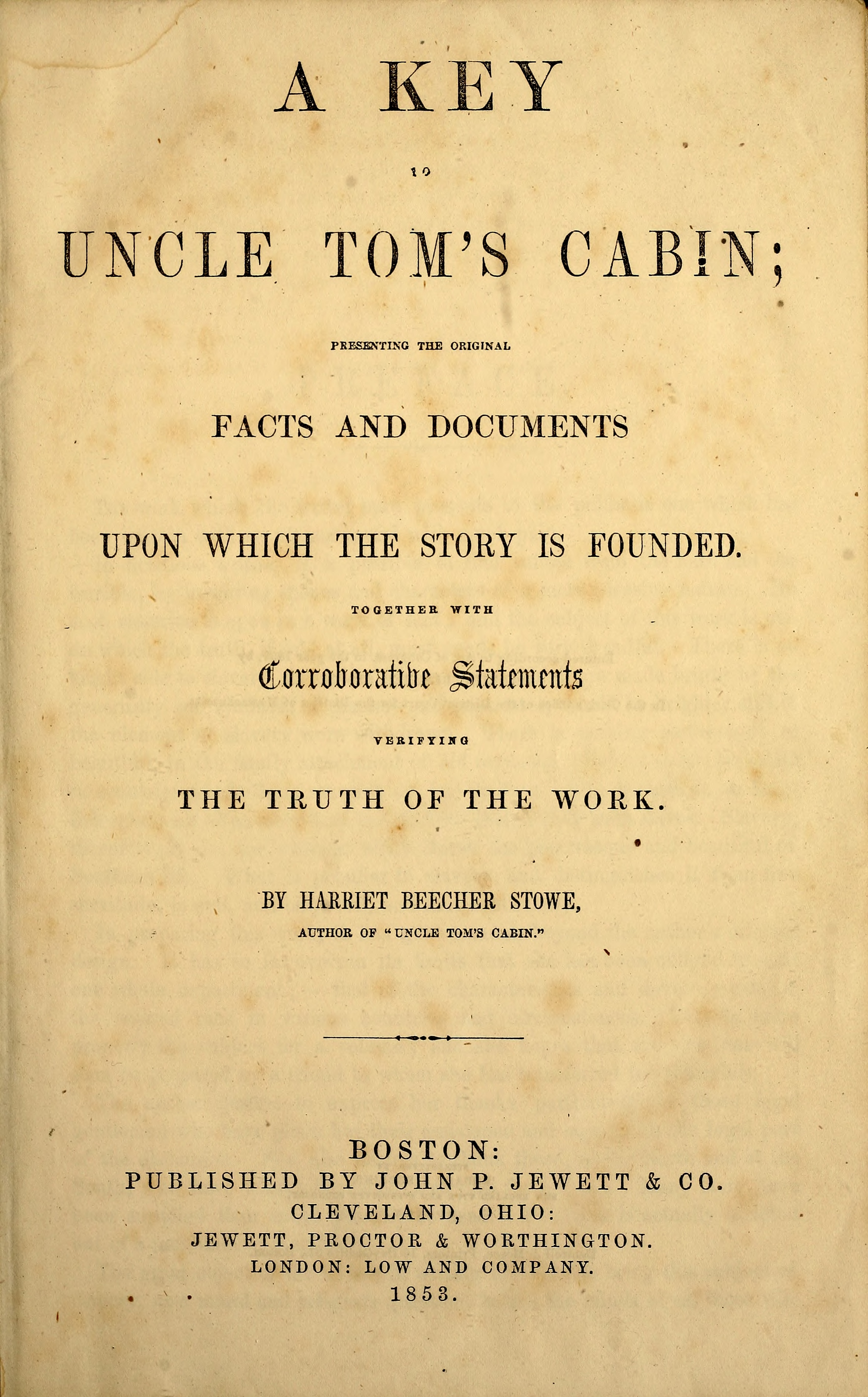
A Key to Uncle Tom's Cabin is a book by American author Harriet Beecher Stowe. It was published to document the veracity of the depiction of slavery in Stowe's anti-slavery novel Uncle Tom's Cabin (1852).

In reasoning and argument mapping, a counterargument is an objection to an objection. A counterargument can be used to rebut an objection to a premise, a main contention or a lemma. Synonyms of counterargument may include rebuttal, reply, counterstatement, counterreason, comeback and response. An attempt to rebut an argument may involve generating a counterargument, or finding a counterexample.

== Use ==
To speak of counterarguments is not to assume that there are only two sides to a given issue nor that there is only one type of counterargument. For a given argument, there are often a large number of counterarguments, some of which are not compatible with each other.

A counterargument might seek to cast doubt on facts of one or more of the first argument's premises, to show that the first argument's contention does not follow from its premises in a valid manner, or the counterargument might pay little attention to the premises and common structure of the first argument and simply attempt to demonstrate that the truth of a conclusion is incompatible with that of the first argument.

A counterargument can be issued against an argument retroactively from the point of reference of that argument. This form of counterargument — invented by the presocratic philosopher Parmenides – is commonly referred to as a retroactive refutation.

== Responding ==
In a debate or in speaking contextual evidence, a counterargument can be handled in a variety of ways.

Responding to a counterargument does not mean utterly obliterating it. You may concede it, minimise it, dismiss it as irrelevant, or attack the supporting evidence or underlying premise. Even if you grant the existence of a problem, you can differ from your audience on the best solution.

— Jo Sprague and Douglas Stuart, The Speaker's Handbook

== See also ==
- Graham's hierarchy of disagreement
- Inference objection
- Counterclaim
