= List of Latin phrases (full) =

This article lists direct English translations of common Latin phrases. Some of the phrases are themselves translations of Greek phrases.

This list is an automatically updated combination of the twenty lists of Latin phrases starting by a given letter.

== A ==
Latin	Translation	Notes
a bene placito	from one well pleased	i.e., "at will" or "at one's pleasure". This phrase, and its Italian (beneplacito) and Spanish (beneplácito) derivatives, are synonymous with the more common ad libitum (at pleasure).
a capite ad calcem	from head to heel	i.e., "from top to bottom", "all the way through", or "from head to toe". See also a pedibus usque ad caput.
a contrario	from the opposite	i.e., "on the contrary" or "au contraire". Thus, an argumentum a contrario ("argument from the contrary") is an argument or proof by contrast or direct opposite.
a Deucalione	from or since Deucalion	A long time ago; from Gaius Lucilius, Satires VI, 284
a falsis principiis proficisci	to set forth from false principles	Legal phrase. From Cicero, De Finibus IV.53.
a fortiori	from the stronger	i.e., "even more so" or "with even stronger reason". Often used to lead from a less certain proposition to a more evident corollary.
a fronte praecipitium, a tergo lupi	a precipice in front, wolves behind	Being in a dilemma. From Plautus, listed in Adagia by Erasmus. See also: "between a rock and a hard place", "between the devil and the deep blue sea".
a maiore ad minus	from the greater to the smaller	From general to particular; "What holds for all X also holds for one particular X." – argument a fortiori
a minore ad maius	from the smaller to the greater	An inference from smaller to bigger; what is forbidden at least is forbidden at more ("If riding a bicycle with two on it is forbidden, riding it with three on it is at least similarly punished.")
a pedibus usque ad caput	from feet to head	i.e., "completely", "from tip to toe", "from head to toe". Equally a capite ad calcem. See also ab ovo usque ad mala.
a posse ad esse	from being able to being	"From possibility to actuality" or "from being possible to being actual".
a posteriori	from the latter	Based on observation, i. e., empirical evidence. Opposite of a priori. Used in mathematics and logic to denote something that is known after a proof has been carried out. In philosophy, used to denote something known from experience.
a priori	from the former	Presupposed independent of experience; the reverse of a posteriori. Used in mathematics and logic to denote something that is known or postulated before a proof has been carried out. In philosophy, used to denote something is supposed without empirical evidence. In everyday speech, it denotes something occurring or being known before the event.
a solis ortu usque ad occasum	from sunrise to sunset	
ab absurdo	from the absurd	Said of an argument either for a conclusion that rests on the alleged absurdity of an opponent's argument (cf. appeal to ridicule) or that another assertion is false because it is absurd. The phrase is distinct from reductio ad absurdum, which is usually a valid logical argument.
ab abusu ad usum non valet consequentia	The inference of a use from its abuse is not valid	i.e., a right is still a right even if it is abused (e.g. practiced in a morally/ethically wrong way); cf. § abusus non tollit usum.
ab aeterno	from the eternal	Literally, "from the everlasting", "from eternity", or "from outside of time". Philosophically and theologically, it indicates something, e. g., the universe, that was created from outside of time. Sometimes used incorrectly to denote something, not from without time, but from a point within time, i.e. "from time immemorial", "since the beginning of time". or "from an infinitely remote time in the past")
ab antiquo	from the ancient	i.e., from ancient times
ab epistulis	from the letters	Regarding or pertaining to correspondence. Ab epistulis was originally the title of the secretarial office in the Roman Empire
ab extra	from beyond/without	Legal term denoting derivation from an external source, as opposed to a person's self or mind—the latter of which is denoted by ab intra.
ab hinc	from here on	Also sometimes written as "abhinc"
ab imo pectore	from the deepest chest	i.e., "from the bottom of my heart", "with deepest affection", or "sincerely". Attributed to Julius Caesar.
ab inconvenienti	from an inconvenient thing	Neo-Latin for "based on unsuitability", "from inconvenience", or "from hardship". An argumentum ab inconvenienti is one based on the difficulties involved in pursuing a line of reasoning, and is thus a form of appeal to consequences. The phrase refers to the legal principle that an argument from inconvenience has great weight.
ab incunabulis	from the cradle	i.e., "from the beginning" or "from infancy". Incunabula is commonly used in English to refer to the earliest stage or origin of something, and especially to copies of books that predate the spread of the printing press c. AD 1500.
ab initio	from the beginning	i.e., "from the outset", referring to an inquiry or investigation. Ab initio mundi means "from the beginning of the world". In literature, it refers to a story told from the beginning rather than in medias res ('from the middle'). In science, it refers to the first principles. In other contexts, it often refers to beginner or training courses. In law, it refers to a thing being true from its beginning or from the instant of the act, rather than from when the court declared it so. Likewise, an annulment is a judicial declaration of the invalidity or nullity of a marriage ab initio: the so-called marriage was "no thing" (Latin: nullius, from which the word "nullity" derives) and never existed, except perhaps in name only.
ab intestato	from an intestate	i.e., from a (dead) decedent, who died without executing a legal will; cf. ex testamento
ab intra	from within	i.e., from the inside, as opposed to ab extra ("from without").
ab invito	against one's will	
ab irato	from/by an angry person	More literally, "from/by an angry man". Though the form irato is masculine, the application of the phrase is not limited to men. Rather, "person" is meant because the phrase probably elides homo ("man/person"), not vir ("man"). It is used in law to describe a decision or action that is motivated by hatred or anger instead of reason and is detrimental to those whom it affects.
ab origine	from the source	i.e., from the origin, beginning, source, or commencement; or, "originally". Root of the word aboriginal.
ab ovo	from the egg	i.e., from the beginning or origin. Derived from the longer phrase in Horace's Satire 1.3: "ab ovo usque ad mala", meaning "from the egg to the apples", referring to how Ancient Roman meals would typically begin with an egg dish and end with fruit (cf. the English phrase soup to nuts). Thus, ab ovo means "from the beginning", and can connote thoroughness.
absens haeres non erit	an absent person will not be an heir	Legal principle that a person who is not present is unlikely to inherit.
absente reo (abs. re.)	[with] the defendant being absent	Legal phrase denoting action "in the absence of the accused".
absit iniuria	absent from injury	i.e., "no offense", meaning to wish that no insult or injury be presumed or done by the speaker's words. Also rendered as absit iniuria verbis ("let injury be absent from these words"). cf. absit invidia.
absit invidia	absent from envy	As opposed to "no offense", absit invidia is said in the context of a statement of excellence, to ward off envious deities who might interpret a statement of excellence as hubris. Also extended to absit invidia verbo ("may ill will/envy be absent from these words"). cf. absit iniuria verbis.
absit omen	absent from omen	i.e., "let this not be a bad omen", expressing the hope that something ill-boding does not turn out to be bad luck in the future.
absolutum dominium	absolute dominion	i.e., total or supreme power, dominion, ownership, or sovereignty
absolvo	I absolve	Legal term pronounced by a judge in order to acquit a defendant following their trial. Te absolvo or absolvo te ("I forgive you") is said by Catholic priests during the Sacrament of Confession, prior to the Second Vatican Council and in vernacular thereafter.
abundans cautela non nocet	abundant caution does no harm	i.e., "one can never be too careful"
ab uno disce omnes	from one, learn all	Refers to situations in which a single example or observation indicates a general or universal truth. Coined in Virgil, Aeneid II 65-6. Example: visible in the court of King Silas in the American television series Kings.
ab urbe condita (AUC)	from the founding of the City	i.e., "from the founding of Rome", which occurred in 753 BC, according to Livy. It was used as a referential year in ancient Rome from which subsequent years were calculated, prior to being replaced by other dating conventions. Also anno urbis conditae (AUC), literally "in the year of the founded city".
abusus non tollit usum	misuse does not remove use	The misuse of some thing does not eliminate the possibility of its correct use. cf. ab abusu ad usum non valet consequentia
ab utili	from utility	Used of an argument
abyssus abyssum invocat	deep calleth unto deep	From Psalms 42:7; some translations have "sea calls to sea".
accipe hoc	take this	Motto of the 848 Naval Air Squadron, British Royal Navy
accusare nemo se debet nisi coram Deo	no one ought to accuse himself except in the presence of God	Legal principle denoting that an accused person is entitled to plead not guilty, and that a witness is not obligated to respond or submit a document that would incriminate himself. A similar phrase is nemo tenetur se ipsum accusare ("no one is bound to accuse himself").
acta deos numquam mortalia fallunt	mortal actions never deceive the gods	Derived from Ovid, Tristia, I.ii, 97: si tamen acta deos numquam mortalia fallunt, / a culpa facinus scitis abesse mea. ("Yet if mortal actions never deceive the gods, / you know that crime was absent from my fault.")
acta est fabula plaudite	The play has been performed; applaud!	Common ending to ancient Roman comedies: Suetonius claimed in The Twelve Caesars that these were the last words of Augustus; Sibelius applied them to the third movement of his String Quartet No. 2, so that his audience would recognize that it was the last one, because a fourth would be ordinarily expected.
acta non verba	Deeds not Words	Motto of the United States Merchant Marine Academy.
acta sanctorum	Deeds of the Saints	Also used in the singular preceding a saint's name: Acta Sancti ("Deeds of Saint") N.; a common title of hagiography works
actiones secundum fidei	action follows belief	i.e., "we act according to what we believe (ourselves to be)."
actore non probante reus absolvitur	A defendant is exonerated by the failure of the prosecution to prove its case	presumption of innocence
actus me invito factus non est meus actus	the act done by me against my will is not my act	
actus non facit reum nisi mens sit rea	The act does not make [a person] guilty unless the mind should be guilty.	Legal principle of the presumption of mens rea in a crime
actus reus	guilty act	The actual crime that is committed, as opposed to the intent, thinking, and rationalizing that procured the criminal act; the external elements of a crime, rather than the internal elements (i.e. mens rea).
ad absurdum	to absurdity	In logic, to the point of being silly or nonsensical. See also reductio ad absurdum. Not to be confused with ab absurdo ("from the absurd").
ad abundantiam	to abundance	Used in legal language when providing additional evidence to an already sufficient collection. Also used commonly as an equivalent of "as if this wasn't enough".
ad acta	to the archives	Denoting the irrelevance of a thing
ad agendum semper parati	Always be prepared for action	Motto of Happy Grove High School in Hector's River, Jamaica.
ad altiora tendo	I strive towards higher things	
ad arbitrium	at will, at pleasure	
ad astra	to the stars	A common name or motto, in whole or part, among many publications
ad astra per aspera	to the stars through difficulties	i.e., "a rough road leads to the stars", as on the Launch Complex 34 memorial plaque for the astronauts of Apollo 1. Used as a motto by the State of Kansas and other organisations
ad augusta per angusta	through difficulties to honours	i.e., to rise to a high position overcoming hardships.
ad captandum vulgus	to captivate the mob	i.e., to appeal to the masses. Often said of or used by politicians. Likewise, an argumentum ad captandum is an argument designed to please the crowd.
ad clerum	to the clergy	Formal letter or communication in the Christian tradition from a bishop to his clergy. An ad clerum may be an encouragement in a time of celebration or a technical explanation of new regulations or canons.
ad coelum or a caelo usque ad centrum	from the sky to the center	i.e., "from Heaven all the way to the center of the Earth". In law, it may refer to the proprietary principle of cuius est solum, eius est usque ad coelum et ad inferos ("whosesoever is the soil, it is his up to the sky and down to the depths [of the Earth]").
ad eundem	to the same	An ad eundem degree (derived from ad eundem gradum, "to the same step or degree") is a courtesy degree awarded by a university or college to an alumnus of another. Rather than an honorary degree, it is a recognition of the formal learning for which the degree was earned at another college.
ad fontes	to the sources	Motto of Renaissance humanism and the Protestant Reformation
ad fundum	to the bottom	i.e., "bottoms up!" (during a generic toast) or "back to the basics", depending on context.
ad hoc	to this	i.e., "for this", in the sense of improvised or intended only for a specific, immediate purpose.
ad hominem	to/at the man	Provides the term argumentum ad hominem, a logical fallacy in which a person themselves is criticized, when the subject of debate is their idea or argument, on the mistaken assumption that the soundness of an argument is dependent on the qualities of the proponent.
ad honorem	to/for the honour	i.e., not for the purpose of gaining any material reward
ad infinitum	to infinity	i.e., enduring forever. Used to designate a property which repeats in all cases in mathematical proof. Also used in philosophical contexts to mean "repeating in all cases".
ad interim (ad int.)	for the meantime	As in the term "chargé d'affaires ad interim", denoting a diplomatic officer who acts in place of an ambassador.
ad kalendas graecas	at the Greek Calends	i.e., "when pigs fly". Attributed by Suetonius in The Twelve Caesars to Augustus. The Calends were specific days of the Roman calendar, not of the Greek, and so the "Greek Kalends" would never occur.
ad libitum (ad lib)	toward pleasure	i.e, "according to what pleases" or "as you wish". In music and theatrical scripts, it typically indicates that the performer has the liberty to change or omit something. Ad lib is often, specifically used when one improvises or ignores limitations. Also used by some restaurants in favor of the colloquial "all you can eat or drink". Libitum comes from the past participle of libere ("to please").
ad limina apostolorum	to the thresholds of the Apostles	i.e., to Rome. Refers specifically to the quinquennial visit ad limina, a formal trip by Catholic bishops to visit the Pope every five years.
ad litem	to the lawsuit	Legal phrase referring to a party appointed by a court to act in a lawsuit on behalf of another party who is deemed incapable of representing himself or herself, such as a child. An individual who acts in this capacity is called a guardian ad litem.
ad locum (ad loc.)	at the place	Used to suggest looking for information about a term in the corresponding place in a cited work of reference.
ad lucem	to the light	frequently used motto for educational institutions
ad maiorem Dei gloriam (AMDG)	For the greater glory of God	motto of the Society of Jesus (Jesuits)
ad meliora	towards better things	Motto of St Patrick's College, Cavan, Ireland
ad mortem	to/at death	Medical phrase serving as a synonym for death
ad multos annos	to many years	Wish for a long life; similar to "many happy returns".
ad nauseam	to sickness	i.e., "to the point of disgust". Sometimes used as a humorous alternative to ad infinitum. An argumentum ad nauseam is a logical fallacy in which erroneous proof is proffered by prolonged repetition of the argument, i. e., the argument is repeated so many times that persons are "sick of it".
ad oculos	to the eyes	i.e., "obvious on sight" or "obvious to anyone that sees it"
ad pedem litterae	to the foot of the letter	i.e., "exactly as it is written", "to the letter", or "to the very last detail"
ad perpetuam memoriam	to the perpetual memory	Generally precedes "of" and a person's name, used to wish for someone to be remembered long after death
ad pondus omnium (ad pond om)	to the weight of all things	i.e., "considering everything's weight". The abbreviation was historically used by physicians and others to signify that the last prescribed ingredient is to weigh as much as all of the previously mentioned ones.
ad quod damnum	to whatever damage	i.e., "according to the harm" or "in proportion to the harm". The phrase is used in tort law as a measure of damages inflicted, implying that a remedy (if one exists) ought to correspond specifically and only to the damage suffered. cf. damnum absque iniuria.
ad referendum (ad ref)	to reference	i.e., subject to be proposed, provisionally approved, but still needing official approval. Not the same as a referendum.
ad rem	to the matter	i.e., "to the point" or "without digression"
ad rem classem paratus	ready for the fleet	Patch motto of the US Naval Station Norfolk
adsumus	here we are	Motto of the Brazilian Marine Corps. A prayer Adsumus, Sancte Spiritus (We stand before You, Holy Spirit) is typically said at the start of every session of an Ecumenical Council or Synod of Bishops in the Catholic Church.
ad susceptum perficiendum	in order to achieve what has been undertaken	Motto of the Association of Trust Schools
ad terminum qui praeteriit	for the term which has passed	Legal phrase for a writ of entry
ad undas	to the waves	i.e., "to Hell"
ad unum	to one	
ad usum Delphini	for the use of the Dauphin	Said of a work that has been expurgated of offensive or improper parts. Originates from editions of Greek and Roman classics which King Louis XIV of France had censored for his heir apparent, the Dauphin. Also rarely in usum Delphini ("into the use of the Dauphin").
ad usum proprium (ad us. propr.)	for one's own use	
ad utrumque paratus	prepared for either [alternative]	Motto of Lund University, with the implied alternatives being the book (study) and the sword (defending the nation in war), of the United States Marine Corps' III Marine Expeditionary Force and of the Spanish Submarine Force
ad valorem	according to value	Used in commerce to refer to ad valorem taxes, i.e., taxes based on the assessed value of real estate or personal property
ad victoriam	to/for victory	Used as a battle cry by the Romans.
ad vitam aeternam	to eternal life	i.e., "to life everlasting". A common Biblical phrase
ad vitam aut culpam	for life or until fault	Used in reference to the ending of a political term upon the death or downfall of the officer (demise as in their commission of a sufficiently grave immorality and/or legal crime).
addendum	thing to be added	i.e., an item to be added, especially as a supplement to a book. The plural is addenda.
adaequatio intellectus et rei	correspondence of mind and reality	One of the classic definitions of "truth:" when the mind has the same form as reality, we think truth. Also rendered as adaequatio intellectus et rei.
adaequatio intellectus nostri cum re	conformity of intellect to the fact	Phrase used in epistemology regarding the nature of understanding.
adsum	I am here	i.e., "present!" or "here!" The opposite of absum ("I am absent").
adtigo planitia Lunae	I will reach the plains of the Moon	Insignia motto of the American IM-1 lunar mission.
adversus solem ne loquitor	do not speak against the Sun	i.e., "do not argue what is obviously/manifestly incorrect."
advocatus diaboli	Devil's advocate	Someone who, in the face of a specific argument, voices an argument that he does not necessarily accept, for the sake of argument and discovering the truth by testing the opponent's argument. cf. arguendo.
aegri somnia	a sick man's dreams	i.e., "troubled dreams". From Horace, Ars Poetica VII 7.
aes alienum	foreign debt	i.e., "someone else's money"
aetatis suae (aetatis, aetat. or aet.)	of his age or in the year of his age	The word aetatis means "of age" (e.g. "aetatis 36" denotes being "of year of age 36" or "in the 36th year of age". Because the first year of age is entered at birth, this is equivalent to "aged 35 years old".) Appears on portraits, gravestones, monuments, etc. Usually preceded by anno (AAS), "in the year # [of his age/life]". Frequently combined with Anno Domini, giving a date as both the age of Jesus Christ and the age of the decedent. Example: "Obiit anno Domini MDCXXXVI^{o} (tricensimo sexto), [anno] aetatis suae XXV^{o} (vicensimo quinto)" ("he died in the 1636th year of the Lord, [being] the 25th [year] of his age[/life]").
affidavit	he asserted	Legal term derived from fides ("faith"), originating at least from Medieval Latin to denote a statement under oath.
age quod agis	do what you do	i.e., "do what you are doing," or "do well whatever you do." Figuratively, it means "keep going, because you are inspired or dedicated to do so." This is the motto of several Catholic schools, and was also used by Pope John XXIII in the sense of "do not be concerned with any other matter than the task in hand;" he was allaying worry of what would become of him in the future: his sense of age quod agis was "joy" regarding what is presently occurring and "detachment" from concern of the future.
agere sequitur esse agere sequitur (esse)	action follows being	Metaphysical and moral principle that indicates the connection of ontology, obligation, and ethics.
Agnus Dei	Lamb of God	Refers both to the innocence of a lamb and to Christ being a sacrificial lamb after the Jewish religious practice. It is the Latin translation from John 1:36, when St. John the Baptist exclaimes "Ecce Agnus Dei!" ("Behold the Lamb of God!") upon seeing Jesus Christ.
alea iacta est	the die has been cast	Said by Julius Caesar (Greek: ἀνερρίφθω κύβος, anerrhíphthō kýbos) upon crossing the Rubicon in 49 BC, according to Suetonius. The original meaning was similar to "the game is afoot", but its modern meaning, like that of the phrase "crossing the Rubicon", denotes passing the point of no return on a momentous decision and entering into a risky endeavor where the outcome is left to chance.
alenda lux ubi orta libertas	Let light be nourished where liberty has arisen	"Light" meaning learning. Motto of Davidson College.
alias	at another time, otherwise	An assumed name or pseudonym; similar to alter ego, but more specifically referring to a name, not to a "second self".
alibi	elsewhere	Legal defense where a defendant attempts to show that he was elsewhere at the time a crime was committed (e.g. "his alibi is sound; he gave evidence that he was in another city on the night of the murder.")
aliquid stat pro aliquo	something stands for something else	Foundational definition in semiotics.
alis aquilae	on an eagle's wings	From Isaiah 40: "But those who wait for the Lord shall find their strength renewed, they shall mount up on wings like eagles, they shall run and not grow weary, they shall walk and not grow faint."
alis grave nil	nothing [is] heavy with wings	i.e., "nothing is heavy to those who have wings"; motto of the Pontifical Catholic University of Rio de Janeiro, Brazil
alis volat propriis	she flies with her own wings	Motto of the State of Oregon, adopted in 1987, replacing the previous state motto of "The Union", which was adopted in 1957.
alma mater	nourishing mother	Term used for the university one attends or has attended. Another university term, matriculation, is also derived from mater. The term suggests that the students are "fed" knowledge and taken care of by the university. It is also used for a university's traditional school anthem.
alter ego	another I	i.e., another self, a second persona or alias. Can be used to describe different facets or identities of a single character, or different characters who seem representations of the same personality. Often used of a fictional character's secret identity.
alterius non sit qui suus esse potest	let no man be another's who can be his own	Usually attributed to Cicero, the phrase is the final sentence in Aesop's ascribed fable "The Frogs Who Desired a King" as appears in the collection commonly known as the "Anonymus Neveleti", in Fable 21B: De ranis a Iove querentibus regem. Used as a motto by Paracelsus.
alterum non laedere	to not wound another	One of the three basic legal precepts in the Digest of Justinian I.
alumnus, or, alumna	pupil	Graduate or former student of a school, college, or university. Plural of alumnus is alumni (male). Plural of alumna is alumnae (female).
a mari usque ad mare	from sea to sea	From Psalm 72:8, "Et dominabitur a mari usque ad mare, et a flumine usque ad terminos terrae" (KJV: "He shall have dominion also from sea to sea, and from the river unto the ends of the earth"). National motto of Canada.
amat victoria curam	victory favours care	Motto of several schools
amicus certus in re incerta	a sure friend in an unsure matter	From Ennius, as quoted by Cicero in Laelius de Amicitia, s. 64
amicus curiae	friend of the court	i.e., an adviser, or a person who can obtain or grant access to the favour of a powerful group (e. g., the Roman Curia). In current U.S. legal usage, an amicus curiae is a third party who is allowed to submit a legal opinion in the form of an amicus brief to the court.
Amicus Plato, sed magis amica veritas.	Plato is my friend, but truth is a better friend.	An assertion that truth is more valuable than friendship. Attributed to Aristotle, Nicomachean Ethics, 1096a15; and Roger Bacon, Opus Majus, Part 1, Chapter 5.
amicus usque ad aras	a friend as far as to the altars	"a friend as far as to the altars", "a friend whose only higher allegiance is to religion", "a friend to the very end".
amittere legem terrae	to lose the law of the land	An obsolete legal phrase signifying the forfeiture of the right of swearing in any court or cause, or to become infamous.
amor Dei intellectualis	intellectual love of God	From Baruch Spinoza
amor et melle et felle est fecundissimus	love is rich with both honey and venom	From Act One, Scene One of Plautus’ play Cistellaria.
amor fati	love of fate	Nietzscheian alternative worldview to that represented through memento mori ("remember you must die"): Nietzsche believed amor fati was more affirmative of life.
amor omnibus idem	love is the same for all	From Virgil, Georgics III
amor patriae	love of the fatherland	i.e., "love of the nation;" patriotism
amor vincit omnia	love conquers all	Originally from Virgil, Eclogues X, 69: omnia vincit amor: et nos cedamus amori ("love conquers all: let us too surrender to love"). The phrase is inscribed on a bracelet worn by the Prioress in Chaucer's Canterbury Tales.
An nescis, mi fili, quantilla prudentia mundus regatur?	Do you not know, my son, with how little wisdom the world is governed?	Written by Axel Oxenstierna in a letter to encourage his son, a delegate to the negotiations that would lead to the Peace of Westphalia, who worried about his ability to hold his own amidst experienced and eminent statesmen and diplomats.
anglice	in English	Used before the anglicized version of a word or name. For example, "Terra Mariae, anglice, Maryland".
animus in consulendo liber	a mind unfettered in deliberation	Motto of NATO
anno (an.)	in the year	Also used in such phrases as anno urbis conditae (see ab urbe condita), Anno Domini, and anno regni.
anno Domini (A.D.)	in the year of our Lord	Abbreviation of Anno Domini Nostri Jesu Christi ("in the year of Our Lord Jesus Christ"), the predominantly-used system for dating years across the world; used with the Gregorian Calendar and based on the perceived year of the birth of Jesus Christ. The years before His birth were formerly signified by a. C. n (ante Christum natum, "before Christ was born"), but now use the English abbreviation "BC" ("before Christ"). For example, Augustus was born in the year 63 BC and died in AD 14.
anno regni	In the year of the reign	Precedes "of" and the current ruler
annuit cœptis	he nods at things now begun	i.e., "he approves our undertakings." Motto on the reverse of the Great Seal of the United States and, consequently, on the reverse of the United States one-dollar bill; in this context the motto refers to God.
annus horribilis	horrible year	Variation on annus mirabilis, recorded in print from 1890. Notably used in a speech by Queen Elizabeth II to describe what a bad year 1992 had been for her. In Classical Latin, this phrase actually means "terrifying year". See also annus terribilis.
annus mirabilis	wonderful year	Used particularly to refer to the years 1665 and 1666, during which Isaac Newton made revolutionary inventions and discoveries in calculus, motion, optics and gravitation. Annus Mirabilis is also the title of a poem by John Dryden written in the same year. It has since been used to refer to other years, especially to 1905, when Albert Einstein made equally revolutionary discoveries concerning the photoelectric effect, Brownian motion, mass-energy equivalence, and the special theory of relativity. (See Annus Mirabilis papers) another use was the Annus Mirabilis of 1759 to commemorate the string of victories won by Britain and her allies.
annus terribilis	dreadful year	Used to describe 1348, the year the Black Death began to afflict Europe.
ante bellum	before the war	As in status quo ante bellum ("as it was before the war"); commonly used as antebellum to refer to the period preceding the American Civil War, primarily in reference to the Southern United States at that time.
ante cibum (a.c.)	before food	Medical shorthand for "before meals"
ante faciem Domini	before the face of the Lord	Motto of the Christian Brothers College, Adelaide
ante litteram	before the letter	Said of an expression or term that describes something which existed before the phrase itself was introduced or became common. Example: Alan Turing was a computer scientist ante litteram, since the field of "computer science" was not yet recognized in Turing's day.
ante meridiem (a.m.)	before midday	From midnight to noon; confer post meridiem
ante mortem	before death	See post mortem ("after death")
ante omnia armari	before all else, be armed	
ante prandium (a.p.)	before lunch	Used on pharmaceutical prescriptions to denote "before a meal". Less common is post prandium ("after lunch").
antiqui colant antiquum dierum	let the ancients worship the ancient of days	The motto of Chester
aperire terram gentibus	open the land to nations	Motto of Ferdinand de Lesseps referring to the Suez and Panama Canals. Also appears on a plaque at Kinshasa train station.
apparatus criticus	tools of a critic	Textual notes or a list of other readings relating to a document, especially in a scholarly edition of a text.
apologia pro vita sua	defense of one's life	
apud	in the writings of	Used in scholarly works to cite a reference at second hand
aqua (aq.)	water	
aqua fortis	strong water	Refers to nitric acid, thus called because of its ability to dissolve all materials except gold and platinum
aqua pura	pure water	Or, "clear water" or "clean water"
aqua regia	royal water	Refers to a mixture of hydrochloric acid and nitric acid, thus called because of its ability to dissolve gold and platinum
aqua vitae	water of life	"Spirit of Wine" in many English texts. Used to refer to various native distilled beverages, such as whisky (uisge beatha) in Scotland and Ireland, gin in the Netherlands, brandy (eau de vie) in France, and akvavit in Scandinavia.
aquila non capit muscas	an eagle does not catch flies	Or, "a noble or important person does not deal with insignificant matters"
arare litus	to plough the seashore	Desiderius Erasmus, Adagia (AD 1508); meaning "wasted labor"
arbiter elegantiarum	judge of tastes	One who prescribes, rules on, or is a recognized authority on matters of social behavior and taste. Said of Petronius. Sometimes found in the singular as arbiter elegantiae ("judge of taste").
arcana imperii	the secrets of power	Originally used by Tacitus to refer to the state secrets and unaccountable acts of the Roman imperial government
arcanum boni tenoris animae	The secret behind a good mood	Motto of the Starobrno Brewery in Brno
arcus senilis	bow of an old person	An opaque circle around the cornea of the eye, often seen in elderly people. When it is found in patients less than 50 years old it is termed arcus juvenilis
arduus ad solem	Striving towards the Sun	Motto of Victoria University of Manchester
argentum album	white silver	Also "silver coin"; mentioned in the Domesday Book; signifies bullion or silver uncoined
arguendo	for arguing	Or, "for the sake of argument". Said when something is done purely in order to discuss a matter or illustrate a point. E. g., "let us assume, arguendo, that your claim is correct."
argumentum	argument	Or "reasoning", "inference", "appeal", or "proof". The plural is argumenta. Commonly used in the names of logical arguments and fallacies, preceding phrases such as a silentio (by silence), ad antiquitatem (to antiquity), ad baculum (to the stick), ad captandum (to capturing), ad consequentiam (to the consequence), ad crumenam (to the purse), ad feminam (to the woman), ad hominem (to the person), ad ignorantiam (to ignorance), ad invidiam (to envy/jealousy/odium/hatred/reproach – appealing to low passions), ad judicium (to judgment), ad lazarum (to poverty), ad logicam (to logic), ad metum (to fear), ad misericordiam (to pity), ad nauseam (to nausea), ad novitatem (to novelty), ad personam (to the character), ad numerum (to the number), ad odium (to spite), ad populum (to the people), ad temperantiam (to moderation), ad verecundiam (to reverence), ex silentio (from silence), in terrorem (into terror), and e contrario (from/to the opposite).
arma christi	weapons of Christ	also known as Instruments of the Passion are the objects associated with the Passion of Jesus Christ in Christian symbolism and art. They are seen as arms in the sense of heraldry, and also as the weapons Christ used to achieve his conquest over Satan.
armata potentia	armed and powerful	charge made by a Justice of the Peace in Medieval England against those who rode in arms against the King's Peace.
ars celare artem	art [is] to conceal art	An aesthetic ideal that good art should appear natural rather than contrived. Of medieval origin, but often incorrectly attributed to Ovid.
ars gratia artis	art for the sake of art	Translated into Latin from Baudelaire's L'art pour l'art. Motto of Metro-Goldwyn-Mayer. While symmetrical for the logo of MGM, the better word order in Latin is "Ars artis gratia".
ars longa, vita brevis	art is long, life is short	Seneca, De Brevitate Vitae, 1.1, translating a phrase of Hippocrates that is often used out of context. The "art" referred to in the original aphorism was the craft of medicine, which took a lifetime to acquire.
arte et labore	by art and by labour	Motto of Blackburn Rovers F.C.
arte et marte	by skill and by fighting	Motto of the Royal Electrical and Mechanical Engineers of the British Army and Electrical and Mechanical Engineering (EME) Branch of the Canadian Forces
Artis Bohemiae Amicis	Friends of Czech Arts	Award of the Minister of Culture of the Czech Republic for the promotion of the positive reputation of Czech culture abroad
asinus ad lyram	an ass to the lyre	Desiderius Erasmus, Adagia (AD 1508); meaning "an awkward or incompetent individual"
asinus asinum fricat	the jackass rubs the jackass	Used to describe 2 persons who are lavishing excessive praise on one another
assecuratus non quaerit lucrum sed agit ne in damno sit	the assured does not seek profit but makes [it his profit] that he not be in loss	Refers to the insurance principle that the indemnity can not be larger than the loss
Astra castra, numen lumen	The stars my camp, the Deity my light.	
astra inclinant, sed non obligant	the stars incline us, they do not bind us	Refers to the distinction of free will from astrological determinism
auctores varii	various authors	Used in bibliography for books, texts, publications, or articles that have more than 3 collaborators
auctoritas	authority	Level of prestige a person had in Roman society
auctoritas non veritas facit legem	authority, not truth, makes law	This formula appears in the 1668 Latin revised edition of Thomas Hobbes's Leviathan, book 2, chapter 26, p. 133.
audacia pro muro et scuto opus	boldness is our wall, action is our shield	Cornelis Jol, in a bid to rally his rebellious captains to fight and conquer the Spanish treasure fleet in 1638.
audacter calumniare, semper aliquid haeret	slander boldly, something always sticks	Francis Bacon, De Augmentis Scientiarum (AD 1623)
audax at fidelis	bold but faithful	Motto of Queensland, Australia
audeamus	let us dare	Motto of the Canadian Special Operations Regiment [CSOR] on their regimental coat of arms; of Otago University Students' Association, a direct response to the university's motto of sapere aude ("dare to be wise"); and of Champlain College in Burlington, Vermont.
audemus jura nostra defendere	we dare to defend our rights	Motto of the State of Alabama, adopted in 1923; translated into Latin from a paraphrase of the stanza "Men who their duties know / But know their rights, and knowing, dare maintain" from William Jones, "What Constitutes a State?"
audentes fortuna iuvat	Fortune favors the bold	From Virgil, Aeneid, Book 10, 284, where the first word is in an archaic form, audentis fortuna iuvat. Allegedly the last words of Pliny the Elder before he left the docks at Pompeii to rescue people from the eruption of Vesuvius in 79. Often quoted as audaces fortuna iuvat. Also the motto of the Portuguese Army Commandos and the USS Montpelier in the latter form.
audere est facere	to dare is to do	Motto of Tottenham Hotspur F.C.
audi alteram partem	hear the other side	Legal principle; also worded as audiatur et altera pars ("let the other side be heard also")
audio hostem	I hear the enemy	Motto of the 845 NAS Royal Navy
audi, vide, tace	hear, see, be silent	
aurea mediocritas	golden mean	From Horace's Odes, 2, 10. Refers to the ethical goal of reaching a virtuous middle ground between two sinful extremes. The golden mean concept is common to many philosophers, chiefly Aristotle.
auri sacra fames	accursed hunger for gold	From Virgil, Aeneid, Book 3, 57. Later quoted by Seneca as quod non mortalia pectora coges, auri sacra fames ("what do not you force mortal hearts [to do], accursed hunger for gold").
auribus teneo lupum	I hold a wolf by the ears	Common ancient proverb, this version from Terence. It indicates that one is in a dangerous situation where both holding on and letting go could be deadly. A modern version is "to have a tiger by the tail".
aurora australis	southern dawn	The Southern Lights, an aurora that appears in the Southern Hemisphere. It is less well-known than the Northern Lights (aurorea borealis). The Aurora Australis is also the name of an Antarctic icebreaker ship.
aurora borealis	northern dawn	The Northern Lights, an aurora that appears in the Northern Hemisphere.
aurora musis amica	dawn is a friend to the muses	Title of a distich by Iohannes Christenius (1599–1672): "Conveniens studiis non est nox, commoda lux est; / Luce labor bonus est et bona nocte quies." ("Night is not suitable for studying, daylight is; / working by light is good, as is rest at night."); in Nihus, Barthold (1642). Epigrammata disticha. Johannes Kinckius.
aurum potestas est	gold is power	Motto of the fictional Fowl Family in the Artemis Fowl series, written by Eoin Colfer
auspicium melioris aevi	hope/token of a better age	Motto of the Order of St Michael and St George and of Raffles Institution in Singapore
Austriae est imperare orbi universo (A.E.I.O.U.)	Austria is to rule the whole world	Motto of the House of Habsburg, coined by Frederick III, Holy Roman Emperor
aut Caesar aut nihil	either Caesar or nothing	Denotes an absolute aspiration to become the Emperor, or the equivalent supreme magistrate, and nothing else. More generally, "all or nothing". A personal motto of Cesare Borgia. Charlie Chaplin also used the phrase in The Great Dictator to ridicule Hynkel's (Chaplin's parody of Hitler) ambition for power, but substituted "nullus" for "nihil".
aut consilio aut ense	either by meeting or the sword	I. e., either through reasoned discussion or through war. It was the first motto of Chile (see coat of arms), changed to Spanish: Por la razón o la fuerza. Name of episode 1 in season 3 of Berlin Station.
aut cum scuto aut in scuto	either with shield or on shield	Or, "do or die" or "no retreat". A Greek expression («Ἢ τὰν ἢ ἐπὶ τᾶς») that Spartan mothers said to their sons as they departed for battle. It refers to the practices that a Greek hoplite would drop his cumbersome shield in order to flee the battlefield, and a slain warrior would be borne home atop his shield.
aut imiteris aut oderis	imitate or loathe it	Seneca the Younger, Epistulae morales ad Lucilium, 7:7. From the full phrase: "necesse est aut imiteris aut oderis" ("you must either imitate or loathe the world").
aut neca aut necare	either kill or be killed	Also: "neca ne neceris" ("kill lest you be killed")
aut pax aut bellum	either peace or war	Motto of the Gunn Clan
aut simul stabunt aut simul cadent	they will either stand together or fall together	Said of two situations that can only occur simultaneously: if one ends, so does the other, and vice versa.
aut viam inveniam aut faciam	I will either find a way or make one	Hannibal
aut vincere aut mori	either to conquer or to die	General pledge of victoria aut mors ("victory or death"). Motto of the Higgenbotham and Higginbottom families of Cheshire, England; participants in the War of the Roses. Also the motto for the United States 1st Fighter Wing, Langley Air Force Base in Virginia.
ave atque vale	hail and farewell	Catullus, Carmen 101, addressed to his deceased brother
Ave Christus Rex	Hail, Christ the King!	Christian phrase signaling devotion to Jesus Christ
ave Europa nostra vera patria	hail Europe, our true fatherland	Anthem of Imperium Europa
Ave Imperator, morituri te salutant	Hail, Emperor! Those who are about to die salute you!	From Suetonius' The Twelve Caesars, Claudius 21. A salute and plea for mercy recorded on one occasion by naumachiarii–captives and criminals fated to die fighting during mock naval encounters. Later versions included a variant of "We who are about to die", and this translation is sometimes aided by changing the Latin to nos morituri te salutamus.
Ave Maria	Hail, Mary	Catholic prayer of intercession asking St. Mary, the Mother of Jesus Christ to pray for the petitioner
ave mater Angliae	Hail, Mother of England	Motto of Canterbury, England

== B ==
Latin	Translation	Notes
barba crescit caput nescit	beard grows, head doesn't grow wiser	
barba non facit philosophum	a beard doesn't make one a philosopher	Wise only in appearance. From Aulus Gellius' Attic Nights
barba tenus sapientes	wise as far as the beard	Wise only in appearance. From Erasmus's collection of Adages.
Beata Virgo Maria (BVM)	Blessed Virgin Mary	A common name in the Roman Catholic Church for Mary, the mother of Jesus. The genitive, Beatae Mariae Virginis (BMV), occurs often as well, appearing with such words as horae (hours), litaniae (litanies) and officium (office), and with some monasteries and secondary schools for girls.
beatae memoriae	of blessed memory	See in memoriam
beati pauperes spiritu	blessed in spirit [are] the poor.	A Beatitude from Matthew 5:3 in the Vulgate: beati pauperes spiritu, quoniam ipsorum est regnum caelorum "Blessed in spirit [are] the poor, for theirs is the kingdom of the heavens".
beati possidentes	blessed [are] those who possess	Translated from Euripides
beati qui ambulant lege domini	blessed are they who walk in the law of the Lord	Inscription above the entrance to St. Andrew's Church (New York City), based on the second half of Psalm 119:1
beati quorum via integra est	blessed are they whose way is upright	first half of Psalm 119:1, base of several musical setting such as the motet Beati quorum via by Charles Villiers Stanford
beatus homo qui invenit sapientiam	blessed is the man who finds wisdom	From Proverbs 3:13; set to music in a 1577 motet of the same name by Orlando di Lasso.
bella gerant alii Protesilaus amet!	let others wage war Protesilaus should love!	Originally from Ovid, Heroides 13.84, where Laodamia is writing to her husband Protesilaus who is at the Trojan War. She begs him to stay out of danger, but he was in fact the first Greek to die at Troy. Also used of the Habsburg marriages of 1477 and 1496, written as bella gerant alii, tu felix Austria nube (let others wage war; you, happy Austria, marry). Said by King Matthias.
bella detesta matribus	war hateful to mothers	From Horace
bello et jure senesco	I grow old through war and law	Motto of the House of d'Udekem d'Acoz
bellum autem ita suscipiatur, ut nihil aliud nisi pax quaesita videatur	war should be made with no other view than the attainment of peace	Cicero, De Officiis I, 80
bellum omnium contra omnes	war of all against all	A phrase used by Thomas Hobbes to describe the state of nature
bellum Romanum	war as the Romans did it	All-out war without restraint as Romans practiced against groups they considered to be barbarians
bellum se ipsum alet	war feeds itself	
Biblia pauperum	Paupers' Bible	Tradition of biblical pictures displaying the essential facts of Christian salvation
bibo ergo sum	I drink, therefore I am	A play on "cogito ergo sum", "I think therefore I am"
bis dat qui cito dat	he gives twice, who gives promptly	A gift given without hesitation is as good as two gifts.
bis in die (bid)	twice in a day	Medical shorthand for "twice a day"
bona fide	in good faith	"well-intentioned", "fairly". In modern contexts, often has connotations of "genuinely" or "sincerely". Bona fides is not the plural (which would be bonis fidebus), but the nominative, and means simply "good faith". Opposite of mala fide.
bona notabilia	note-worthy goods	In law, if a person dying has goods, or good debts, in another diocese or jurisdiction within that province, besides his goods in the diocese where he dies, amounting to a certain minimum value, he is said to have bona notabilia; in which case, the probat of his will belongs to the archbishop of that province.
bona officia	good services	A nation's offer to mediate in disputes between two other nations
bona patria	goods of a country	A jury or assize of countrymen, or good neighbors
bona vacantia	vacant goods	United Kingdom legal term for ownerless property that passes to The Crown
boni pastoris est tondere pecus non deglubere	it is a good shepherd's [job] to shear his flock, not to flay them	Tiberius reportedly said this to his regional commanders, as a warning against taxing the populace excessively.
bono malum superate	overcome evil with good	Motto of Westonbirt School
bonum commune communitatis	common good of the community	Or "general welfare". Refers to what benefits a society, as opposed to bonum commune hominis, which refers to what is good for an individual. In the film Hot Fuzz, this phrase is chanted by an assembled group of people, in which context it is deliberately similar to another phrase that is repeated throughout the film, which is The Greater Good.
bonum commune hominis	common good of a man	Refers to an individual's happiness, which is not "common" in that it serves everyone, but in that individuals tend to be able to find happiness in similar things.
boreas domus, mare amicus	the North is our home, the sea is our friend	Motto of Orkney
brutum fulmen	harmless (or inert) thunderbolt	Used to indicate either an empty threat, or a judgement at law which has no practical effect
busillis	baffling puzzle, thorny problem	John of Cornwall (ca. 1170) was once asked by a scribe what the word meant. It turns out that the original text said in diebus illis [in those days], which the scribe misread as in die busillis [at the day of Busillis], believing this was a famous man. This mondegreen has since entered the literature; it occurs in Alessandro Manzoni's novel The Betrothed (1827), in Dostoevsky's The Brothers Karamazov (1880), and in Andrea Camilleri's Inspector Montalbano series.

== C ==
Latin	Translation	Notes
cacatum non est pictum	That's shat, not painted.	From Gottfried August Bürger's Prinzessin Europa (line 60); popularised by Heinrich Heine's Deutschland. Ein Wintermärchen (XI, 44); also the title of Joseph Haydn's canon for four voices, Hob. XXVIIb:16; Ludwig van Beethoven set the text by Bürger as a three-voice canon, WoO 224. Contemporary critics applied this epithet to both of Turner's Regulus (1828 and 1837).
cacoethes scribendi	insatiable desire to write	Cacoēthes "bad habit", or medically, "malignant disease" is a borrowing of Greek kakoēthes. The phrase is derived from a line in the Satires of Juvenal: Tenet insanabile multos scribendi cacoethes, or "the incurable desire (or itch) for writing affects many". See hypergraphia.
cadavera vero innumera	truly countless bodies	Used by the Romans to describe the aftermath of the Battle of the Catalaunian Plains.
Caedite eos. Novit enim Dominus qui sunt eius.	Kill them all. For the Lord knows those who are his.	Supposed statement by Abbot Arnaud Amalric before the Massacre at Béziers during the Albigensian Crusade, recorded 30 years later, according to Caesarius of Heisterbach. cf. "Kill them all and let God sort them out."
Caelum non animum mutant qui trans mare currunt	Those who hurry across the sea change the sky [upon them], not their souls or state of mind	Hexameter in epistle 11 of Horace's Epistles. Seneca shortens it to Animum debes mutare, non caelum (You must change [your] disposition, not [your] sky) in his Letter to Lucilius XXVIII, 1.
Caesar non supra grammaticos	Caesar has no authority over the grammarians	Political power is limited; it does not include power over grammar.
caetera desunt	the rest is missing	Caetera is Medieval Latin spelling for cētera.
calix meus inebrians	my cup making me drunk	
calamus gladio fortior	The pen is mightier than the sword	
camera obscura	dark chamber	An optical device used in drawing, and an ancestor of modern photography. The source of the word camera.
Cane Nero magna bella Persica	Tell, oh Nero, of the great wars of Persia	Perfectly correct Latin sentence usually reported as funny from modern Italians because the same exact words, in today's dialect of Rome, mean "A black dog eats a beautiful peach", which has a ridiculously different meaning.
canes pugnaces	war dogs or fighting dogs	
canescunt vani, vanescunt cani	The vain turn grey, the grey vanish	A play on words.
canis canem edit	dog eats dog	Not from classical Latin; a situation where nobody is safe from anybody, each man for himself. Original name of the video game Bully.
capax Dei	capable of receiving God	From Augustine, De Trinitate XIV, 8.11: Mens eo ipso imago Dei est quo eius capax est, "The mind is the image of God, in that it is capable of Him and can be partaker of Him."
capax imperii nisi imperasset	capable of imperial power if only he had not held it	In Tacitus's Histories to describe Galba as emperor
capax infiniti	holding the infinite	Capability of achieving goals by force of many instead of a single individual
caput inter nubila (condit)	(she plunges) [her] head in the clouds	So aggrandized as to be beyond practical (earthly) reach or understanding (from Virgil's Aeneid and the shorter form appears in John Locke's Two Treatises of Government)
caput mortuum	dead head	Originally an alchemical reference to the dead head or worthless residue left over from a reaction. Also used to refer to a freeloader or worthless element.
Caritas Christi	The love of Christ	It implies a command to love as Christ loved. Motto of St. Francis Xavier High School located in West Meadowlark Park, Edmonton.
Caritas Christi urget nos	The love of Christ impels us or The love of Christ drives us	Motto of the Sisters of Charity
Caritas in veritate	Charity in truth	Pope Benedict XVI's third encyclical
carpe diem	seize the day	An exhortation to live for today. From Horace, Odes I, 11.8. Carpere refers to plucking of flowers or fruit. The phrase collige virgo rosas has a similar sense.
carpe noctem	seize the night	An exhortation to make good use of the night, often used when carpe diem would seem absurd, e.g., when observing a deep-sky object or conducting a Messier marathon or engaging in social activities after sunset.
carpe vinum	seize the wine	
Carthago delenda est	Carthage must be destroyed	The Roman senator Cato the Elder ended every speech after the Second Punic War with ceterum censeo Carthaginem esse delendam, literally "For the rest, I am of the opinion that Carthage is to be destroyed."
castigat ridendo mores	One corrects customs by laughing at them	Or, "[Comedy/Satire] criticises customs through humour", is a phrase coined by French Neo-Latin poet Jean-Baptiste de Santeul (1630–1697), but sometimes wrongly attributed to his contemporary Molière or to Roman lyric poet Horace.
Casum sentit dominus	accident is felt by the owner	Refers to the private law principle that the owner has to assume the risk of accidental harm to him or accidental loss to his property.
casus belli	event of war	Refers to an incident that is the justification or case for war.
causa latet, vis est notissima	The cause is hidden, but the result is well known.	Ovid: Metamorphoses IV, 287; motto of Alpha Sigma Phi.
causa mortis	cause of death	
cave	beware!	especially used by Doctors of Medicine, when they want to warn each other (e.g.: "cave nephrolithiases" in order to warn about side effects of an uricosuric). Spoken aloud in some British public (paid) schools by pupils to warn each other of impending authority.
cave canem	Beware of the dog	Earliest written example is in the Satyricon of Petronius, circa 1st century C.E.
caveat emptor	let the buyer beware	The purchaser is responsible for checking whether the goods suit his need. Phrases modeled on this one replace emptor with lector, subscriptor, venditor, utilitor: "reader", "signer", "seller", "user".
caveat venditor	let the seller beware	It is a counter to caveat emptor and suggests that sellers can also be deceived in a market transaction. This forces the seller to take responsibility for the product and discourages sellers from selling products of unreasonable quality.
cedant arma togae	let arms yield to the gown	"Let military power yield to civilian power", Cicero, De Officiis I:77. Former motto of the Territory of Wyoming. See also Toga#Roman military.
cedere nescio	I know not how to yield	Motto of HMAS Norman
Celer – Silens – Mortalis	Swift – Silent – Deadly	The motto of the force reconnaissance companies of the United States Marine Corps, also known as force recon.
celerius quam asparagi cocuntur	more swiftly than asparagus [stem]s are cooked	Or simply "faster than cooking asparagus". A variant of the Roman phrase velocius quam asparagi coquantur, using a different adverb and an alternative mood and spelling of coquere.
cepi corpus	I have taken the body	In law, it is a return made by the sheriff, upon a capias, or other process to the like purpose; signifying, that he has taken the body of the party. See also habeas corpus.
certiorari	to be made certain	From certiorari volumus, "we wish to be made certain." A prerogative writ, by which a superior court orders an inferior one to turn over its record for review. Now used, depending on the jurisdiction, for an order granting leave to appeal a decision (e.g. to the Supreme Court of the United States) or judicial review of a lower court's order.
certum est quod certum reddi potest	it is certain, whatever can be rendered certain	Or "... if it can be rendered certain." Often used in law when something is not known, but can be ascertained (e.g. the purchase price on a sale which is to be determined by a third-party valuer)
cessante ratione legis cessat ipsa lex	when the reason for the law ceases, the law itself ceases	A rule of law becomes ineffective when the reason for its application has ceased to exist or does not correspond to the reality anymore. By Gratian.
cetera desunt	the rest are missing	Also spelled "caetera desunt".
ceteris paribus	all other things being equal	That is, disregarding or eliminating extraneous factors in a situation.
charta pardonationis se defendendo	a paper of pardon to defend oneself	The form of a pardon for killing another man in self-defence (see manslaughter).
charta pardonationis utlagariae	a paper of pardon to the outlaw	The form of a pardon of a man who is outlawed. Also called perdonatio utlagariae.
Christianos ad leones	[Throw the] Christians to the lions!	
Christo et Doctrinae	For Christ and Learning	The motto of Furman University.
Christus nos liberavit	Christ has freed us	title of volume I, book 5, chapter XI of Les Misérables by Victor Hugo.
Christus Rex	Christ the King	A Christian title for Jesus.
Cicero dicit fac hoc	Cicero says do it	Said by some to be the origin of the game command and title Simon says.
Cicero pro domo sua	Cicero's speech in 57 BC to regain his confiscated house	Said of someone who pleads cases for their own benefit; see List of Latin phrases (P) § pro domo
circa (c.) or (ca.)	around	In the sense of "approximately" or "about". Usually used of a date.
circulus in probando	circle made in testing [a premise]	Circular reasoning. Similar term to circulus vitiosus.
circulus vitiosus	vicious circle	In logic, begging the question, a fallacy involving the presupposition of a proposition in one of the premises (see petitio principii). In science, a positive feedback loop. In economics, a counterpart to the virtuous circle.
citius altius fortius	faster, higher, stronger	Motto of the modern Olympics.
civis romanus sum	I am (a) Roman citizen	Is a phrase used in Cicero's In Verrem as a plea for the legal rights of a Roman citizen
clamea admittenda in itinere per atturnatum	a claim to be admitted to the eyre by an attorney	A writ whereby the king of England could command the justice of an eyre (a medieval form of circuit court) to permit an attorney to represent a person who is employed in the king's service and therefore cannot come in person.
clarere audere gaudere	[be] bright, daring, joyful	Motto of the Geal family
clausum fregit	he broke the enclosure	A legal action for trespass to land; so called because the writ demands the person summoned to answer wherefore he broke the close (quare clausum fregit), i.e., why he entered the plaintiff's land.
claves Sancti Petri	the keys of Saint Peter	A symbol of the Papacy.
clavis aurea	golden key	The means of discovering hidden or mysterious meanings in texts, particularly applied in theology and alchemy.
clerico admittendo	for being made a clerk	In law, a writ directed to the bishop, for the admitting a clerk to a benefice upon a ne admittas, tried, and found for the party who procures the writ.
clerico capto per statutum mercatorum		In law, a writ for the delivery of a clerk out of prison, who is imprisoned upon the breach of statute merchant.
clerico convicto commisso gaolae in defectu ordinarii deliberando		In law, a writ for the delivery of a clerk to his ordinary, that was formerly convicted of felony; by reason that his ordinary did not challenge him according to the privilege of clerks.
clerico intra sacros ordines constituto non eligendo in officium		In law, a writ directed to the bailiffs, etc., that have thrust a bailiwick or beadleship upon one in holy orders; charging them to release him.
Codex Iuris Canonici	Book of Canon Law	The official code of canon law in the Roman Catholic Church (cf. Corpus Iuris Canonici).
Cogitationis poenam nemo patitur	No one suffers punishment for mere intent.	No one can be punished for their thoughts.
cogito, ergo sum	I think, therefore I am.	A rationalistic argument used by French philosopher René Descartes to attempt to prove his own existence.
coitus interruptus	interrupted congress	Aborting sexual intercourse prior to ejaculation—the only permitted form of birth control in some religions.
coitus more ferarum	congress in the way of beasts	A medical euphemism for the doggy-style sexual position.
collige virgo rosas	pick, girl, the roses	Exhortation to enjoy fully the youth, similar to Carpe diem, from "De rosis nascentibus" (also titled "Idyllium de rosis"), attributed to Ausonius or Virgil. / "Gather ye rosebuds while ye may", 1909, by John William Waterhouse
combinatio nova	new combination	It is frequently abbreviated comb. nov.. It is used in the life sciences literature when a new name is introduced, e.g. Klebsiella granulomatis comb. nov..
comedamus et bibamus, cras enim moriemur	let us eat and drink, for tomorrow we die	Latin translation of no. 72 of John Chrysostom's 88 Greek homilies on the Gospel of John, citing Isaiah 22:13
communibus annis	in common years	One year with another; on an average. "Common" here does not mean "ordinary", but "common to every situation"
communibus locis	in common places	A term frequently used among philosophical and other writers, implying some medium, or mean relation between several places; one place with another; on a medium. "Common" here does not mean "ordinary", but "common to every situation"
communis opinio	common opinion	prevailing doctrine, generally accepted view (in an academic field), scientific consensus; originally communis opinio doctorum, "common opinion of the doctors"
compos mentis	in control of the mind	Describes someone of sound mind. Sometimes used ironically. Also a legal principle, non compos mentis (not in control of one's faculties), used to describe an insane person.
concilio et labore	by wisdom and effort	Motto of the city of Manchester
concordia cum veritate	in harmony with truth	Motto of the University of Waterloo
concordia salus	well-being through harmony	Motto of Montreal; Bank of Montreal coat of arms and motto
concordia parvae res crescunt	small things grow in harmony	Motto of the Worshipful Company of Merchant Taylors and the corresponding schools for girls and for boys, Crosby, and in Northwood.
condemnant quod non intellegunt	They condemn what they do not understand or They condemn because they do not understand	The quod here is ambiguous: it may be the relative pronoun or a conjunction.
condicio sine qua non	condition without which not	A required, indispensable condition. Commonly mistakenly rendered with conditio ("seasoning" or "preserving") in place of condicio ("arrangement" or "condition").
conditur in petra	it is founded on the rock	Motto of Peterhouse Boys' School and Peterhouse Girls' School
confer (cf.)	compare	The abbreviation cf. is used in text to suggest a comparison with something else (cf. citation signal).
Congregatio Sanctissimi Redemptoris C.Ss.R	Congregation of the Most Holy Redeemer	Redemptorists
coniunctis viribus	with connected strength	Or "with united powers". Sometimes rendered conjunctis viribus. Motto of Queen Mary, University of London.
consensu	with consent	
consuetudo pro lege servatur	Custom serves for law.	Where there are no specific laws, the matter should be decided by custom; established customs have the force of laws. Also consuetudo est altera lex (custom is another law) and consuetudo vincit communem legem (custom overrules the common law); see also: Consuetudinary.
consummatum est	It is completed.	The last words of Jesus on the cross in the Latin translation of John 19:30.
contemptus mundi/saeculi	scorn for the world/times	Despising the secular world. The monk or philosopher's rejection of a mundane life and worldly values.
contra bonos mores	against good morals	Offensive to the conscience and to a sense of justice.
contra legem	against law	Especially in civil law jurisdictions, said of an understanding of a statute that directly contradicts its wording and thus is valid neither by interpretation nor by analogy.
contra mundum	against the world	against public opinion; see also contra mundum injunction, enforceable against anyone, rather than a named party; Athanasius Contra Mundum, Athanasius of Alexandria, 4th-century Christian patriarch and theologian, exiled five times by four emperors.
contra proferentem	against the proferror	In contract law, the doctrine of contractual interpretation which provides that an ambiguous term will be construed against the party that imposed its inclusion in the contract – or, more accurately, against the interests of the party who imposed it.
contra spem spero	I hope against hope	Title of a poem by Lesya Ukrainka; it derives from an expression found in Paul's Letter to the Romans 4:18 (Greek: παρ' ἐλπίδα ἐπ' ἐλπίδι, Latin: contra spem in spe[m]) with reference to Abraham the Patriarch who maintained faith in becoming the father of many nations despite being childless and well-advanced in years.
contra vim mortis non crescit herba (or salvia) in hortis	No herb (or sage) grows in the gardens against the power of death	there is no medicine against death; from various medieval medicinal texts
contradictio in terminis	contradiction in terms	Something that would embody a contradiction with the very definition of one of its terms; for example, payment for a gift, or a circle with corners. The fallacy of proposing such a thing.
contra principia negantem non est disputandum	there can be no debate with those who deny the foundations	Debate is fruitless when you don't agree on common rules, facts, presuppositions.
cor ad cor loquitur	heart speaks to heart	From Augustine's Confessions, referring to a prescribed method of prayer: having a "heart to heart" with God. Commonly used in reference to a later quote by Cardinal John Henry Newman. A motto of Newman Clubs.
cor aut mors	Heart or Death	(Your choice is between) The Heart (Moral Values, Duty, Loyalty) or Death (to no longer matter, no longer to be respected as person of integrity.)
cor meum tibi offero domine prompte et sincere	my heart I offer to you Lord promptly and sincerely	John Calvin's personal motto, also adopted by Calvin College
cor unum	one heart	A popular school motto and often used as a name for religious and other organisations such as the Pontifical Council Cor Unum.
coram	in the presence of	Used before a list of the names of the judges on a panel hearing a particular case.
coram Deo	in the presence of God	A phrase from Christian theology which summarizes the idea of Christians living in the presence of, under the authority of, and to the honor and glory of God; see also coram Deo.
coram episcopo	in the presence of the bishop	Refers to the celebration of Mass in the Roman Catholic Church where the bishop is present but does not preside over the service. Cf. coram Summo Pontifice, in the presence of the Pope, in similar circumstances.
coram nobis, coram vobis	in our presence, in your presence	Two kinds of writs of error, calling for the decision to be reviewed by the same court that made it. Coram nobis is short for quae coram nobis resident (let them, i.e. the matters on the court record, remain before us), and was the form historically used for the Court of King's Bench; the "us" means the King, who was theoretically the head of that court. Coram vobis is the analogous version ("let the matters remain before you") for the Court of Common Pleas, where the King did not sit, even notionally.
coram non judice	not before a judge	legal proceeding that is outside the presence of a judge, thus a violation of the law and a nullity
coram populo	in the presence of the people	
coram publico	in view of the public	
Corpus Christi	Body of Christ	The name of a feast in the Roman Catholic Church commemorating the Eucharist. It is also the name of a city in Texas, Corpus Christi, Texas, the name of Colleges at Oxford and Cambridge universities, and a controversial play.
corpus delicti	body of the offence	The fact that a crime has been committed, a necessary factor in convicting someone of having committed that crime; if there was no crime, there can not have been a criminal.
Corpus Iuris Canonici	Body of Canon Law	The official compilation of canon law in the Roman Catholic Church (cf. Codex Iuris Canonici).
Corpus Juris Civilis	Body of Civil Law	The body of Roman or civil law.
corpus vile	worthless body	A person or thing fit only to be the object of an experiment, as in the phrase 'Fiat experimentum in corpore vili.'
corrigenda	things to be corrected	
corruptio optimi pessima	the corruption of the best is the worst	
corruptissima re publica plurimae leges	When the republic is at its most corrupt the laws are most numerous	Tacitus
corvus oculum corvi non eruit	a raven does not pick out an eye of another raven	
corruptus in extremis	corrupt to the extreme	Motto of the fictional Mayor's office in The Simpsons
cras amet qui nunquam amavit; quique amavit, cras amet	May he who has never loved before, love tomorrow; And may he who has loved, love tomorrow as well	The refrain from the 'Pervigilium Veneris', a poem which describes a three-day holiday in the cult of Venus, located somewhere in Sicily, involving the whole town in religious festivities joined with a deep sense of nature and Venus as the "procreatrix", the life-giving force behind the natural world.
cras es noster	Tomorrow, be ours	As "The Future is Ours", motto of San Jacinto College, Texas
creatio ex nihilo	creation out of nothing	A concept about creation, often used in a theological or philosophical context. Also known as the 'First Cause' argument in philosophy of religion. Contrasted with creatio ex materia.
Credo in Unum Deum	I Believe in One God	The first words of the Nicene Creed and the Apostles' Creed.
credo quia absurdum est	I believe it because it is absurd	A very common misquote of Tertullian's et mortuus est Dei Filius prorsus credibile quia ineptum est (and the Son of God is dead: in short, it is credible because it is unfitting), meaning that it is so absurd to say that God's son has died that it would have to be a matter of belief, rather than reason. The misquoted phrase, however, is commonly used to mock the dogmatic beliefs of the religious (see fideism). This phrase is commonly shortened to credo quia absurdum, and is also sometimes rendered credo quia impossibile est (I believe it because it is impossible) or, as Darwin used it in his autobiography, credo quia incredibile.
credo ut intelligam	I believe so that I may understand	A motto of St Anselm, used as the motto of St. Anselm Hall, Manchester
crescamus in Illo per omnia	May we grow in Him through all things	Motto of Cheverus High School
crescat scientia vita excolatur	let knowledge grow, let life be enriched	Motto of the University of Chicago; often rendered in English as an iambic tetrameter, "Let knowledge grow from more to more, and so be human life enriched".
crescente luce	Light ever increasing	Motto of James Cook University
Crescite et multiplicamini	Increase and multiply	Motto of Maryland until 1874
crescit cum commercio civitas	Civilization prospers with commerce	Motto of Claremont McKenna College.
crescit eundo	it grows as it goes	From Lucretius' De rerum natura book VI, where it refers in context to the motion of a thunderbolt across the sky, which acquires power and momentum as it goes. This metaphor was adapted as the state motto of New Mexico (adopted in 1887 as the territory's motto, and kept in 1912 when New Mexico received statehood) and is seen on the seal. Also the motto of Rocky Mount, Virginia and Omega Delta Phi.
cruci dum spiro fido	while I live, I trust in the cross, Whilst I trust in the Cross I have life	Motto of the Sisters of Loreto (IBVM) and its associated schools.
cucullus non facit monachum	The hood does not make the monk	William Shakespeare, Twelfth Night, act 1, scene 5, 53–54
cui bono	Good for whom?	"Who benefits?" An adage in criminal investigation which suggests that considering who would benefit from an unwelcome event is likely to reveal who is responsible for that event (cf. cui prodest). Also the motto of the Crime Syndicate of America, a fictional supervillain group. The opposite is cui malo (Bad for whom?).
cui multum sit datum, multum ab eo postulabitur	to whom much is given, much is expected	Motto of The Brooklyn Latin School. Taken from the Gospel of Luke 12:48.
cui prodest	for whom it advances	Short for cui prodest scelus is fecit (for whom the crime advances, he has done it) in Seneca's Medea. Thus, the murderer is often the one who gains by the murder (cf. cui bono).
cuique suum	to each his own	
cuius est solum, eius est usque ad coelum et ad inferos	Whose the land is, all the way to the sky and to the underworld is his.	First coined by Accursius of Bologna in the 13th century. A Roman legal principle of property law that is no longer observed in most situations today. Less literally, "For whosoever owns the soil, it is theirs up to the sky and down to the depths."
cuius regio, eius religio	whose region, his religion	The privilege of a ruler to choose the religion of his subjects. A regional prince's ability to choose his people's religion was established at the Peace of Augsburg in 1555.
cuiusvis hominis est errare, nullius nisi insipientis in errore perseverare.	Anyone can err, but only the fool persists in his fault	Cicero, Philippica XII, 5.
culpa	fault	Also "blame" or "guilt". In law, an act of neglect. In general, guilt, sin, or a fault. See also mea culpa.
Cum Deo pro Patria et Libertate	With God for Fatherland and Liberty	Appears on Francis II Rákóczi's flag
cum fontibus	with sources	e.g., Woltjer, Jan (1877). Lucretii philosophia cum fontibus comparata [Lucretius's philosophy, compared with its sources] (Thesis). Groningen: Noordhoff Uitgevers.
cum gladiis et fustibus	with swords and clubs	From the Bible. Occurs in Matthew 26:47 and Luke 22:52.
cum gladio et sale	with sword and salt	Motto of a well-paid soldier. See salary.
cum grano salis	with a grain of salt	Not to be taken too seriously or as the literal truth.
cum hoc ergo propter hoc	with this, therefore on account of this	Fallacy of assuming that correlation implies causation.
cum laude	with praise	The standard formula for academic Latin honors in the United States. Greater honors include magna cum laude and summa cum laude.
cum mortuis in lingua mortua	with the dead in a dead language	Movement from Pictures at an Exhibition by Modest Mussorgsky
cum privilegio ad imprimendum solum	with the exclusive right to print	Copyright notice used in 16th-century England, used for comic effect in The Taming of the Shrew by William Shakespeare where Lucentio is urged by his servant Biondello to "seize your privilege to declare her [Bianca] yours alone".
cum tempore (c.t.)	with time	academic custom to start lectures 15 minutes later than advertised; sine tempore (s.t.) indicates lectures start on time.
cuncti adsint meritaeque expectent praemia palmae	let all come who by merit deserve the most reward	Motto of University College London.
cupio dissolvi	desire to be dissolved	From the Bible, locution indicating a will to death ("I want to die").
cur Deus Homo	Why the God-Man	The question attributed to Anselm in his work of by this name, wherein he reflects on why the Christ of Christianity must be both fully Divine and fully Human. Often translated "why did God become Man?"
cura personalis	care for the whole person	Motto of Georgetown University School of Medicine and University of Scranton
cura te ipsum	take care of your own self	Exhortation to physicians, or experts in general, to deal with their own problems before addressing those of others
curriculum vitae	course of life	An overview of a person's life and qualifications, similar to a résumé
custodi civitatem, Domine	guard the city, O Lord	Motto of the City of Westminster
custos morum	keeper of morals	A censor
cygnis insignis	distinguished by its swans	Motto of Western Australia
cygnus inter anates	swan among ducks	

== D ==
Latin	Translation	Notes
da Deus fortunae	O God, give fortune/happiness	A traditional greeting of Czech brewers.
da mihi factum, dabo tibi ius	Give me the fact, I will give you the law	Also da mihi facta, dabo tibi ius (plural "facta" (facts) for the singular "factum"). A legal principle of Roman law that parties to a suit should present the facts and the judge will rule on the law that governs them. Related to iura novit curia (the court knows the law).
damnant quod non intellegunt	They condemn what they do not understand	Paraphrase of Quintilianus, De Institutione Oratoria, Book 10, chapter 1, 26: "Modesto tamen et circumspecto iudicio de tantis viris pronuntiandum est, ne, quod plerisque accidit, damnent quae non intellegunt." [Yet students must pronounce with diffidence and circumspection on the merits of such illustrious characters, lest, as is the case with many, they condemn what they do not understand. (translated by Rev. John Selby Watson)
damnatio ad bestias	condemnation to [the] beasts	Colloquially, "thrown to the lions".
damnatio memoriae	damnation of memory	The ancient Roman custom by which it was pretended that disgraced Romans, especially former emperors, never existed, by eliminating all records and likenesses of them.
damnum absque injuria	damage without injury	Meaning a loss that results from no one's wrongdoing. In Roman law, a person is not responsible for unintended, consequential injury to another that results from a lawful act. This protection does not necessarily apply to unintended damage caused by one's negligence or folly.
damnum fatale	damage through fate	A loss arising from an inevitable accident where individual persons cannot be held legally liable for damages.
dat deus incrementum, or, deus dat incrementum	God gives growth	Motto of several schools.
data venia	with due respect / given the excuse	Used before disagreeing with someone.
datum perficiemus munus	We shall accomplish the mission assigned	Motto of Batalhão de Operações Policiais Especiais (BOPE), Rio de Janeiro, Brazil.
de bene esse	as well done	In law, a de bene esse deposition is used to preserve the testimony of a witness who is expected not to be available to appear at trial and be cross-examined.
de bonis asportatis	carrying goods away	In law, trespass de bonis asportatis was the traditional name for larceny, i.e., the unlawful theft of chattels (moveable goods).
de dato	of the date	Used, e.g., in "as we agreed in the meeting d.d. 26th May 2006".
de facto	by deed	Said of something that is the actual state of affairs, in contrast to something's legal or official standing, which is described as de jure. De facto refers to "the way things really are" rather than what is officially presented as the fact of the matter in question.
de fideli	with faithfulness	A clerk of a court makes this declaration when he is appointed, by which he promises to perform his duties faithfully as a servant of the court.
de fideli administratione	of faithful administration	Describes an oath taken to faithfully administer the duties of a job or office, like that taken by a court reporter.
de futuro	regarding the future	Usually used in the context of "at a future time".
de gustibus non est disputandum	Of tastes there is nothing to be disputed	Less literally, "there is no accounting for taste", because they are judged subjectively and not objectively: everyone has their own and none deserve preeminence. The complete phrase is "de gustibus et coloribus non est disputandum" ("when we talk about tastes and colours there is nothing to be disputed"). Probably of Scholastic origin; see Wiktionary.
de integro	again, a second time	
de jure	by law	"Official", in contrast with de facto; analogous to "in principle", whereas de facto is to "in practice". In other contexts, it can mean "according to law", "by right", and "legally".
de lege ferenda	of/from law to be passed	
de lege lata	of/from law passed / of/from law in force	
de medietate linguae	of half-tongue	from [a person's] language [group]; party jury; the right to a jury disproportionally chosen from the accused's ethnic group; see struck jury.
de minimis non curat lex	The law does not care about the smallest things.	A court does not care about small, trivial things. A case must have some importance in order for a court to hear it. See "de minimis non curat praetor". Also used as an adjective: "The court found that the alleged conduct was de minimis."
de minimis non curat praetor	The commander does not care about the smallest things.	Also, "The chief magistrate does not concern himself with trifles." Trivial matters are no concern of a high official; cf. aquila non capit muscas (the eagle does not catch flies). Sometimes rex (king) or lex (law) is used in place of praetor.
de mortuis aut bene aut nihil	about the dead, either well or nothing	Less literally, "speak well of the dead or not at all"; cf. de mortuis nil nisi bonum.
de mortuis nil nisi bonum	about the dead, nothing unless a good thing	From de mortuis nil nisi bonum dicendum est ("nothing must be said about the dead except the good"), attributed by Diogenes Laërtius to Chilon. In legal contexts, this quotation is used with the opposite meaning: defamation of a deceased person is not a crime. In other contexts, it refers to taboos against criticizing the recently deceased.
de nobis fabula narratur	About us is the story told	Thus: "their story is our story". Originally it referred to the end of Rome's dominance. Now often used when comparing any current situation to a past story or event.
de novo	from the new	"Anew" or "afresh". In law, a trial de novo is a retrial of the issues as though they had not been tried before. In biology, de novo means newly synthesized, and a de novo mutation is a mutation that neither parent possessed or transmitted. In economics, de novo refers to newly founded companies, and de novo banks are state banks that have been in operation for five years or less. (Cf. ex novo)
de omni re scibili et quibusdam aliis	about every knowable thing, and even certain other things	The Italian scholar Giovanni Pico della Mirandola of the 15th century wrote the De omni re scibili ("concerning every knowable thing") part, and a wag added et quibusdam aliis ("and even certain other things").
de omnibus dubitandum	Be suspicious of everything / doubt everything	Attributed to the French philosopher René Descartes. It was also Karl Marx's favorite motto and a title of one of Søren Kierkegaard's works, namely, De Omnibus Dubitandum Est.
de oppresso liber	free from having been oppressed	Loosely, "to liberate the oppressed". Motto of the United States Army Special Forces.
de praescientia Dei	from/through the foreknowledge of God	Motto of the Worshipful Company of Barbers.
de profundis	from the depths	Meaning from out of the depths of misery or dejection. From the Latin translation of the Vulgate Bible of Psalm 130, of which it is a traditional title in Roman Catholic liturgy.
de re	about/regarding the matter	In logic, de dicto statements regarding the truth of a proposition are distinguished from de re statements regarding the properties of a thing itself.
decessit sine prole	died without issue	Used in genealogical records, often abbreviated as d.s.p., to indicate a person who died without having had any children.
decessit sine prole legitima	died without legitimate issue	Used in genealogical records, often abbreviated as d.s.p.l., to indicate a person who died without having had any children with a spouse.
decessit sine prole mascula legitima	died without legitimate male issue	Used in genealogical records in cases of nobility or other hereditary titles, often abbreviated as d.s.p.m.l. or d.s.p.m. legit, to indicate a person who died without having had any legitimate male children (indicating there were illegitimate male children)
decessit sine prole mascula superstite	died without surviving male issue	Used in genealogical records, often abbreviated as d.s.p.m., to indicate a person who died without having had any male children who survived, i.e. outlived him.
decessit sine prole superstite	died without surviving issue	Used in genealogical records, often abbreviated as d.s.p.s., to indicate a person who died without having had any children who survived, i.e. outlived him.
decessit vita matris	died in the lifetime of the mother	Used in genealogical records, often abbreviated as d.v.m., to indicate a person who predeceased his or her mother.
decessit vita patris	died in the lifetime of the father	Used in genealogical records, often abbreviated as d.v.p., to indicate a person who predeceased his or her father.
decus et tutamen	an ornament and a safeguard	A phrase from Virgil's Aeneid. Inscription on British one-pound coins. Originally inscribed on coins of the 17th century, it refers to the inscribed edge of the coin as a protection against the clipping of its precious metal.
defendit numerus	There is safety in numbers	
Defensor Fortis	Defender of the Force	Official motto of the United States Air Force Security Forces (Security Police).
Dei gratia	By the grace of God	Part of the full style of a monarch historically considered to be ruling by divine right, notably in the style of the English and British monarch since 1521
Dei gratia rex	By the Grace of God, King	Also Dei gratia regina ("By the Grace of God, Queen"). Abbreviated as D G REX on British and Canadian coins. Also occurs on coins of the Holy Roman Empire such as the Otto Adelheid Pfennig.
Dei sub numine viget	Under God's Spirit she flourishes	Motto of Princeton University, Princeton, New Jersey, United States.
delectatio morosa	peevish delight	In Catholic theology, pleasure taken in a sinful thought or imagination, such as brooding on sexual images. As voluntary and complacent erotic fantasizing, without attempt to suppress such thoughts, it is distinct from actual sexual desire.
delegata potestas non potest delegari	Delegated powers can not be [further] delegated	A legal principle whereby one to whom certain powers were delegated may not ipso facto re-delegate them to another. A distinction may be had between delegated powers and the additional power to re-delegate them.
delirant isti Romani	They are mad, those Romans[!]	A Latin translation of René Goscinny's phrase in French ils sont fous, ces romains! or Italian Sono pazzi questi Romani. Cf. SPQR, which Obelix frequently used in the Asterix comics.
Deo ac veritati	for God and for truth	Motto of Colgate University.
Deo confidimus	In God we trust	Motto of Somerset College.
Deo Dante Dedi	God having given I gave	Motto of Charterhouse School.
Deo domuique	For God and for home	Motto of Methodist Ladies' College, Melbourne.
Deo et patriae	For God and country	Motto of Regis High School in New York City, New York, United States.
Deo gratias	Thanks [be] to God	A frequent phrase in the Roman Catholic liturgy, used especially after the recitation of a lesson, the Last Gospel at Mass or as a response to Ite Missa Est / Benedicamus Domino.
Deo juvante	with God's help	Motto of Monaco and its monarch, which is inscribed on the royal arms.
Deo non fortuna	by God, not fortune/luck	Motto of the Epsom College in Surrey, England and Fairham Freemasons Lodge No.8002 in the province of Nottinghamshire.
Deo optimo maximo (DOM)	To the best and greatest God	Derived from the pagan Iupiter optimo maximo ("to the best and greatest Jupiter"). Printed on bottles of Bénédictine liqueur.
Deo patriae litteris	For God, country, [and] learning	motto of Scotch College (Melbourne)
Deo regi vicino	For God, king and neighbour	motto of Bromsgrove School
Deo vindice	with God as protector / with an avenging God	motto of the defunct Confederate States of America
Deo volente	God willing	This was often used in conjunction with a signature at the end of letters. It was used in order to signify that "God willing" this letter will get to you safely, "God willing" the contents of this letter come true. As an abbreviation (simply "D.V.") it is often found in personal letters (in English) of the early 1900s, employed to generally and piously qualify a given statement about a future planned action, that it will be carried out, so long as God wills it (see James 4:13–15, which encourages this way of speaking); cf. inshallah. Motto of Southern Illinois University Carbondale.
descensus in cuniculi cavum	The descent into the cave of the rabbit	Down the rabbit hole; backtranslation, not a genuine Latin phrase; see Down the rabbit hole.
desiderantes meliorem patriam	they desired a better land	From Hebrews 11:16; the motto of the Order of Canada.
Deus adiuta Romanis	God help the Romans	An inscription minted on Eastern Roman hexagrams during the Byzantine–Sasanian War of 602–628.
Deus caritas est	God Is Love	Title and first words of the first encyclical of Pope Benedict XVI. For other meanings see Deus caritas est (disambiguation).
deus ex machina	a god from a machine	From the Greek ἀπὸ μηχανῆς θεός (apò mēchanēs theós). A contrived or artificial solution, usually to a literary plot. Refers to the practice in Greek drama of lowering by crane (the mechanê) an actor playing a god or goddess onto the stage to resolve an insuperable conflict in the plot. The device is most commonly associated with Euripides.
Deus lux mea est	God is my light	The motto of The Catholic University of America.
Deus meumque jus	God and my right	The principal motto of Scottish Rite Freemasonry. See also Dieu et mon droit.
Deus nobis haec otia fecit	God has given us these days of leisure	Motto of the city of Liverpool, England.
Deus nobiscum	God with us	Motto of Methodist College Belfast
Deus nolens exitus	Get results, whether God likes it or not	Literally: Results, God unwilling. A modern creation with questionable grammar; used in James Islington's The Will of the Many (2023) from his Hierarchy series; title of an episode of the podcast The Sheridan Tapes.
Deus otiosus	God at leisure	
Deus spes nostra	God is our hope	The motto of Sir Thomas de Boteler, founder of Boteler Grammar School in Warrington in 1526.
Deus vult	God wills it	The principal slogan of the Crusades. Motto of Bergen Catholic High School in New Jersey, United States.
Dicebamus hesterna die...	[As] we were saying yesterday...	Attributed to Fray Luis de León, the beginning of his first lecture after resuming his professorship at Salamanca University following four years of imprisonment by the Inquisition
dictatum erat (dict)	as previously stated	A recent academic substitution for the spacious and inconvenient phrase "as previously stated". Literally, has been stated. Compare also "dicta prius"; literally, said previously.
dicto simpliciter	[from] a maxim, simply	I.e. "from a rule without exception." Short for a dicto simpliciter, the a is often dropped because it is confused with the English indefinite article. A dicto simpliciter occurs when an acceptable exception is ignored or eliminated. For example, the appropriateness of using opiates is contingent on suffering extreme pain. To justify the recreational use of opiates by referring to a cancer patient or to justify arresting said patient by comparing him to the recreational user would be a dicto simpliciter.
dictum factum	what is said is done	Motto of United States Navy Fighter Squadron VF-194.
dictum meum pactum	my word [is] my bond	Motto of the London Stock Exchange.
diem perdidi	I have lost the day	From the Roman Emperor Titus. Recorded in the biography of him by Suetonius in Lives of the Twelve Caesars.
dies irae	Day of wrath	Reference to the Judgment Day in Christian eschatology. The title of a famous Medieval Latin hymn by Tommaso da Celano in the 13th century and used in the Requiem Mass.
dies non juridicum	Day without judiciary	Days under common law (traditionally Sunday), during which no legal process can be served and any legal judgment is invalid. The English Parliament first codified this precept in the reign of King Charles II.
dies tenebrosa sicut nox	a day as dark as night	First entry in Annales Cambriae, for the year 447.
dimidium facti, qui coepit, habet	He has half the deed done, who has made a beginning.	From the second letter by Horace in his First Book of Letters: Dimidium facti, qui coepit, habet; sapere aude, incipe. [... dare to know, begin].
dirigo	I direct	In Classical Latin, "I arrange". Motto of the State of Maine, United States; based on a comparison of the State to the star Polaris.
dis aliter visum	It seemed otherwise to the gods	In other words, the gods have ideas different from those of mortals, and so events do not always occur in the way persons wish them to. Cf. Virgil, Aeneid, 2: 428. Also cf. "Man proposes and God disposes" and "My Thoughts are not your thoughts, neither are your ways My ways", Isaiah 55, 8–9.
dis manibus sacrum (D.M.S.)	Sacred to the ghost-gods	Refers to the Manes, i.e. Roman spirits of the dead. Loosely, "to the memory of". A conventional pagan inscription preceding the name of the deceased on their tombstone; often shortened to dis manibus (D.M.), "for the ghost-gods". Preceded in some earlier monuments by hic situs est (H. S. E.), "he lies here".
disce aut discede	learn or depart / learn or leave	Motto of Royal College, Colombo and of King's School, Rochester.
disce ut semper victurus, vive ut cras moriturus	Learn as if [you will] live forever; live as if [you will] die tomorrow.	Attributed to St. Edmund of Abingdon; first seen in Isidoro de Sevilla
discendo discimus	while learning we learn	See also § docendo discitur
discere faciendo	learn by doing	Motto of the three California Polytechnic State Universities of San Luis Obispo, Pomona, and Humboldt, United States.
disiecta membra	scattered limbs	I.e., "scattered remains". Paraphrased from Horace, Satires, 1, 4, 62, where it is written "disiecti membra poetae" (limbs of a scattered poet).
ditat Deus	God enriches	Motto of the State of Arizona, United States, adopted in 1911. Probably derived from the translation of the Vulgate Bible of Genesis 14: 23.
divide et impera	divide and rule / "divide and conquer"	A Roman maxim adopted by Roman Dictator Julius Caesar, King Louis XI of France and the Italian political author Niccolò Machiavelli.
dixi	I have spoken	A popular, eloquent expression, usually used in the end of a speech. The implied meaning is that the speaker has said all that had to be said and thus the argument is completed.
["...", ...] dixit	["...", ...] said	Used to attribute a statement or opinion to its author, rather than the speaker.
do ut des	I give that you may give	Often said or written of sacrifices, in which one "gives" and expects a return from the gods.
docendo discitur	It is learned by teaching / one learns by teaching	Attributed to Seneca the Younger.
docendo disco, scribendo cogito	I learn by teaching, I think by writing	
doli capax	capable of guilt	person's ability to commit a wrongful act with the knowledge that it is wrong; cf. doli incapax.
dolus specialis	special intent	"The ... concept is particular to a few civil law systems and cannot sweepingly be equated with the notions of 'special' or 'specific intent' in common law systems. Of course, the same might equally be said of the concept of 'specific intent', a notion used in the common law almost exclusively within the context of the defense of voluntary intoxication." (Genocide scholar William A. Schabas)
Domine dirige nos	O Lord, guide us	Motto of the City of London, England.
Domine salvum fac Regem	O Lord, save the king	Psalm 20, 10.
Domine salvam fac Reginam	O Lord, save the queen	After Psalm 20, 10.
Dominica in albis [depositis]	Sunday in [Setting Aside the] White Garments	Latin name of the Octave of Easter in the Roman Catholic liturgy.
Dominium maris baltici	Dominion over the Baltic Sea	The territorial aim of the Danish and Swedish kingdoms during the Late Medieval and Early Modern Period to rule over the Baltic Sea
Dominus fortitudo nostra	The Lord is our strength	Motto of the Southland College, Philippines. Psalm 28, 8.
Dominus illuminatio mea	The Lord is my light	Motto of the University of Oxford, England. Psalm 27, 1.
Dominus pastor	The Lord is [our] shepherd	Motto of St. John's College and Prep School, Harare, Zimbabwe. After Psalm 23, 1.
Dominus vobiscum	The Lord be with you.	A phrase used in the Roman Catholic liturgy, and sometimes in its sermons and homilies, and a general form of greeting among and towards members of Catholic organizations. See also Pax vobiscum.
dona nobis pacem	give us peace	Often set to music, either by itself or as the final phrase of the Agnus Dei prayer of the Holy Mass.
donatio mortis causa	a donation in expectation of death	A legal concept in which a person in imminent mortal danger need not satisfy the otherwise requisite consideration to effect a testamentary donation, i.e., a donation by instituting or modifying a will.
draco dormiens nunquam titillandus	a sleeping dragon is never to be tickled	Motto of the fictional Hogwarts School of Witchcraft and Wizardry of the Harry Potter series; translated more loosely in the books as "never tickle a sleeping dragon".
dramatis personae	the parts/characters of the play	More literally, "the masks of the drama"; the cast of characters of a dramatic work.
duae tabulae rasae in quibus nihil scriptum est	two blank slates with nothing written upon them	Stan Laurel, inscription for the fan club logo of The Sons of the Desert.
ducimus	we lead	Motto of the Royal Canadian Infantry Corps.
ducit amor patriae	love of country leads me	Motto of the 51st Battalion, Far North Queensland Regiment, Australia.
ducunt volentem fata, nolentem trahunt	the fates lead the willing and drag the unwilling	Attributed to Lucius Annaeus Seneca (Sen. Ep. 107.11).
ductus exemplo	leadership by example	Motto of the United States Marine Corps Officer Candidates School, at the base in Quantico, Virginia, United States.
dulce bellum inexpertis	war is sweet to the inexperienced	Meaning: "war may seem pleasant to those who have never been involved in it, though the experienced know better". Erasmus of Rotterdam.
dulce est desipere in loco	It is sweet on occasion to play the fool. / It is pleasant to relax once in a while.	Horace, Odes 4, 12, 28. Also used by George Knapton for the portrait of Sir Bourchier Wrey, 6th Baronet in 1744.
dulce et decorum est pro patria mori	It is sweet and honorable to die for the fatherland.	Horace, Odes 3, 2, 13. Also used by Wilfred Owen for the title of a poem regarding World War I, Dulce et Decorum Est (calling it "the old Lie").
dulce et utile	a sweet and useful thing / pleasant and profitable	Horace, Ars Poetica: poetry must be dulce et utile, i.e., both enjoyable and instructive.
dulce periculum	danger is sweet	Horace, Odes, 3 25, 16. Motto of the Scottish clan MacAulay.
dulcius ex asperis	sweeter after difficulties	Motto of the Scottish clan Fergusson.
dum cresco spero	I hope when I grow	Motto of The Ravensbourne School.
dum Roma deliberat Saguntum perit	while Rome debates, Saguntum is in danger	Used when someone has been asked for urgent help, but responds with no immediate action. Similar to Hannibal ante portas, but referring to a less personal danger.
dum spiro spero	while I breathe, I hope	Cicero. Motto of the State of South Carolina. Motto of the Clan MacLennan.
dum vita est, spes est	while there is life, there is hope	
dum vivimus servimus	while we live, we serve	Motto of Presbyterian College.
dum vivimus, vivamus	while we live, let us live	An encouragement to embrace life." Emily Dickinson used the line in a whimsical valentine written to William Howland in 1852 and subsequently published in the Springfield Daily Republican:
duos habet et bene pendentes	he has two, and they dangle nicely	According to legend, the words spoken by the cardinal verifying that a newly-elected pope was a man, in a test employed after the reign of pope Joan.
dura lex sed lex	[the] law [is] harsh, but [it is the] law	A shortening of quod quidem perquam durum est, sed ita lex scripta est ("which indeed is extremely harsh, but thus was the law written"). Ulpian, quoted in the Digesta Iustiniani, Roman jurist of the 3rd century AD.
dura mater	tough mother	The outer covering of the brain.
durante bene placito	during good pleasure	Meaning: "serving at the pleasure of the authority or officer who appointed". A Mediaeval legal Latin phrase.
durante munere	while in office	For example, the Governor General of Canada is durante munere the Chancellor and Principal Companion of the Order of Canada.
dux	leader	
dux bellorum	leader of wars	description of King Arthur in Historia Brittonum (The History of the Britons); used as title for a 2012 board war game set in the age of King Arthur.

== E ==
Latin	Translation	Notes
e causa ignota	of unknown cause	Often used in medicine when the underlying disease causing a symptom is not known. See also idiopathic.
E pluribus unum	out of many, one	Literally, out of more (than one), one. The former national motto of the United States, which "In God We Trust" later replaced; therefore, it is still inscribed on many U.S. coins and on the U.S. Capitol. Also the motto of S.L. Benfica. Less commonly written as ex pluribus unum
ecce Agnus Dei	behold the lamb of God	John the Baptist exclaims this after seeing Jesus
ecce ancilla domini	behold the handmaiden of the Lord	From Luke 1:38 in the Vulgate Bible. Name of an 1850 oil painting by Dante Gabriel Rossetti and motto of Bishopslea Preparatory School.
ecce homo	behold the man	From the Gospel of John in the Vulgate 19:5 (Douay-Rheims), where Pontius Pilate speaks these words as he presents Jesus, crowned with thorns, to the crowd. It is also the title of Nietzsche's autobiography and of the theme music by Howard Goodall for the ITV comedy Mr. Bean, in which the full sung lyric is Ecce homo qui est faba ("Behold the man who is a bean").
ecce panis angelorum	behold the bread of angels	From the Catholic hymn Lauda Sion; occasionally inscribed near the altar of Catholic churches; it refers to the Eucharist, the Bread of Heaven; the Body of Christ. See also: Panis angelicus.
editio princeps	first edition	The first published edition of a work.
Ego sum	I am	Phrase from the Gospel of John as a title of Jesus (based on the Koine Greek term ἐγώ εἰμι Ego eimi)
ego te absolvo	I absolve you	Part of the formula of Catholic sacramental absolution, i. e., spoken by a priest as part of the Sacrament of Penance (see also absolvo).
ego te provoco	I challenge you	Used as a challenge; "I dare you". Can also be written as te provoco.
eheu fugaces labuntur anni	Alas, the fleeting years slip by	From Horace's Odes, 2, 14
ejusdem generis	of the same kinds, class, or nature	From the canons of statutory interpretation in law. When more general descriptors follow a list of many specific descriptors, the otherwise wide meaning of the general descriptors is interpreted as restricted to the same class, if any, of the preceding specific descriptors.
Eligo in Summum Pontificem	I elect as Supreme Pontiff	The text printed on the ballots used by cardinals to vote for a new pope during a Conclave.
eluceat omnibus lux	let the light shine out from all	The motto of Sidwell Friends School
emeritus	veteran	Retired from office. Often used to denote an office held at the time of one's retirement, as an honorary title, e. g. professor emeritus and provost emeritus. Inclusion in one's title does not necessarily denote that the honorand is inactive in the pertinent office.
emollit mores nec sinit esse feros	a faithful study of the liberal arts humanizes character and permits it not to be cruel	From Ovid, Epistulae ex Ponto (II, 9, 48). Motto of University of South Carolina.
ens causa sui	existing because of oneself	Or "being one's own cause". Traditionally, a being that owes its existence to no other being, hence God or a Supreme Being (see also Primum Mobile).
ense petit placidam sub libertate quietem	by the sword she seeks a serene repose under liberty	Motto of the U.S. state of Massachusetts, adopted in 1775.
entia non sunt multiplicanda praeter necessitatem	entities must not be multiplied beyond necessity	Occam's razor or Law of Parsimony; arguments which do not introduce extraneous variables are to be preferred in logical argumentation.
entitas ipsa involvit aptitudinem ad extorquendum certum assensum	reality involves a power to compel certain assent	A phrase used in modern Western philosophy on the nature of truth.
eo ipso	by that very (act)	Technical term in philosophy and law. Similar to ipso facto. Example: "The fact that I am does not eo ipso mean that I think." From the Latin ablative form of id ipsum ("that thing itself").
eo nomine	by that name	
epicuri de grege porcum	A pig from the herd (or sty) of Epicurus	From Horace, Epistles
equo ne credite	do not trust the horse	From Virgil, Aeneid, II. 48–49; a reference to the Trojan Horse.
erga omnes	in relation to everyone	Used in law, especially international law, to denote a kind of universal obligation.
ergo	therefore	Denotes a logical conclusion (see also cogito ergo sum).
errantis voluntas nulla est	the will of a mistaken party is void	Roman legal principle formulated by Pomponius in the Digest of the Corpus Juris Civilis, stating that legal actions undertaken by man under the influence of error are invalid.
errare humanum est	to err is human	Sometimes attributed to Seneca the Younger, but not attested: Errare humanum est, perseverare autem diabolicum, et tertia non datur (To err is human; to persist [in committing such errors] is of the devil, and the third possibility is not given.) Several authors contemplated the idea before Seneca: Livy, Venia dignus error is humanus (Storie, VIII, 35) and Cicero: is Cuiusvis errare: insipientis nullius nisi, in errore perseverare (Anyone can err, but only the fool persists in his fault) (Philippicae, XII, 2, 5). Cicero, being well-versed in ancient Greek, may well have been alluding to Euripides' play Hippolytus some four centuries earlier. 300 years later Saint Augustine of Hippo recycled the idea in his Sermones, 164, 14: Humanum fuit errare, diabolicum est per animositatem in errore manere. The phrase gained currency in the English language after Alexander Pope's An Essay on Criticism of 1711: "To err is human, to forgive divine" (line 325).
erratum	error	I. e., mistake. Lists of errors in a previous edition of a work are often marked with the plural errata ("errors").
eruditio et religio	scholarship and duty	Motto of Duke University
esse est percipi	to be is to be perceived	Motto of George Berkeley for his subjective idealist philosophical position that nothing exists independently of its perception by a mind except minds themselves.
esse quam videri	to be, rather than to seem	Truly being a thing, rather than merely seeming to be a thing. The motto of many institutions. From Cicero, De amicitia (On Friendship), Chapter 26. Prior to Cicero, Sallust used the phrase in Bellum Catilinae, 54, 6, writing that Cato esse quam videri bonus malebat ("preferred to be good, rather than to seem so"). Earlier still, Aeschylus used a similar phrase in Seven Against Thebes, line 592: ou gar dokein aristos, all' enai thelei ("he wishes not to seem the best, but to be the best"). Motto of the State of North Carolina.
est modus in rebus	there is measure in things	there is a middle or mean in things, there is a middle way or position; from Horace, Satires 1.1.106; see also: Golden mean (philosophy). According to Potempski and Galmarini (Atmos. Chem. Phys., 9, 9471–9489, 2009) the sentence should be translated as: "There is an optimal condition in all things", which in the original text is followed by sunt certi denique fines quos ultra citraque nequit consistere rectum ("There are therefore precise boundaries beyond which one cannot find the right thing").
esto perpetua	may it be perpetual	Said of Venice, Italy, by the Venetian historian Fra Paolo Sarpi shortly before his death. Motto of the U.S. state of Idaho, adopted in 1867; of S. Thomas' College, Mount Lavinia, Sri Lanka; of Sigma Phi Society; of Main Street Hall, a dormitory at Phillips Exeter Academy.
esto quod es	be what you are	Motto of Wells Cathedral School
et adhuc sub iudice lis est	it is still before the court	From Horace, Ars Poetica (The Art of Poetry) 1.78.
et alibi (et al.)	and elsewhere	A less common variant on et cetera ("and the rest") used at the end of a list of locations to denote unenumerated/omitted ones.
et alii, et aliae, et alia (et al.)	and others	Used similarly to et cetera ("and the rest") to denote names that, usually for the sake of space, are unenumerated/omitted. Alii is masculine, and therefore it can be used to refer to men, or groups of men and women; the feminine et aliae is proper when the "others" are all female, but as with many loanwords, interlingual use, such as in reference lists, is often invariable. Et alia is neuter plural and thus in Latin text is properly used only for inanimate, genderless objects, but some use it as a gender-neutral alternative. APA style and MLA style uses et al. if the work cited was written by more than three authors; AMA style lists all authors if ≤6, and 3 + et al. if >6. AMA style forgoes the period (because it forgoes the period on abbreviations generally) and it forgoes the italic (as it does with other loanwords naturalized into scientific English); many journals that follow AMA style do likewise.
et cetera (etc., &c.)	and the rest	In modern usage, used to mean "and so on" or "and more".
et cum spiritu tuo	and with your spirit	The usual response to the phrase Dominus vobiscum used in Roman Catholic liturgy, for instance at several points during the Catholic Mass. Also used as a general form of greeting among and towards members of Catholic organisations.
et facere et pati fortia Romanum est	Acting and suffering bravely is the attribute of a Roman	The words of Gaius Mucius Scaevola when Lars Porsena captured him
et facta est lux	And light came to be or was made	From Genesis, 1:3: "and there was light". Motto of Morehouse College in Atlanta, Georgia, United States. See also Fiat lux.
et hoc genus omne	and all that sort of thing	Abbreviated as e.h.g.o. or ehgo
et in Arcadia ego	and in Arcadia [am] I / I [am/exist] even in Arcadia	Phrased from the perspective of the personification of death to indicate death's reality under even the most blissful of circumstances, associated in classical times with the then-pastoral Arcadia region of the Peloponnese in Greece; see also memento mori; also the name of paintings and TV episodes – see Et in Arcadia ego (disambiguation).
et lux in tenebris lucet	and light shines in the darkness	From the Gospel of John 1.5, Vulgate. Motto of the Pontifical Catholic University of Peru. See also Lux in Tenebris, 1919 play by Bertolt Brecht.
et nunc reges intelligite erudimini qui judicatis terram	"And now, O ye kings, understand: receive instruction, you that judge the earth."	From the Book of Psalms, II.x. (Vulgate) Archived 2016-03-06 at the Wayback Machine, 2.10 (Douay-Rheims).
et passim (et pass.)	and throughout	Used in citations after a page number to indicate that there is further information in other locations in the cited resource. See also passim.
et sequentes (et seq.)	and the following (masculine/feminine plural)	Also et sequentia ("and the following things": neut.), abbreviations: et seqq., et seq., or sqq. Commonly used in legal citations to refer to statutes that comprise several sequential sections of a code of statutes (e. g. National Labor Relations Act, 29 U.S.C. § 159 et seq.; New Jersey Prevention of Domestic Violence Act, N.J. Stat. Ann. § 2C:25-17 et seq.).
et suppositio nil ponit in esse	and a supposition puts nothing in being	More usually translated as "Sayin' it don't make it so".
Et tu, Brute?	And you, Brutus?	Or "Even you, Brutus?" or "You too, Brutus?" Indicates betrayal by an intimate associate. From William Shakespeare, Julius Caesar, based on the traditional dying words of Julius Caesar. However, these were almost certainly not Caesar's true last words: Plutarch quotes Caesar as saying in Greek, the language of the Roman elite at the time, καὶ σὺ τέκνον (Kaì sù téknon?), translated as "You too, (my) child?", quoting from Menander.
et uxor (et ux.)	and wife	A legal term.
et vir	and husband	A legal term.
Etiam si omnes, ego non	Even if all others, I will never	Saint Peter to Jesus, from the Vulgate, Gospel of Matthew 26:33; New King James Version: Matthew 26:33).
etsi deus non daretur	even if God were not a given	This sentence synthesizes a famous concept of Hugo Grotius (1625).
evoles ut ira breve nefas sit; regna	arise, that your anger may [only] be a brief evil; control [it]	A bilingual palindrome, yielding its English paraphrase, "Anger, 'tis safe never. Bar it! Use love!"
ex abundanti cautela	out of an abundance of caution	In law, describes someone taking precautions against a very remote contingency. "One might wear a belt in addition to braces ex abundanti cautela". In banking, a loan in which the collateral is more than the loan itself. Also the basis for the term "an abundance of caution" employed by United States President Barack Obama to explain why the Chief Justice of the US Supreme Court John Roberts had to re-administer the presidential oath of office, and again in reference to terrorist threats.
ex abundantia enim cordis os loquitur	for out of the abundance of the heart the mouth speaketh.	From the Gospel of Matthew, XII.xxxiv (Vulgate), 12.34 (Douay-Rheims) and the Gospel of Luke, VI.xlv (Vulgate), 6.45 (Douay-Rheims). Sometimes rendered without enim ("for").
ex aequo	from the equal	Denoting "on equal footing", i. e., in a tie. Used for those two (seldom more) participants of a competition who demonstrated identical performance.
ex Africa semper aliquid novi	"(There is) always something new (coming) out of Africa"	Pliny the Elder, Naturalis Historia, 8, 42 (unde etiam vulgare Graeciae dictum semper aliquid novi Africam adferre), a translation of the Greek «Ἀεὶ Λιβύη φέρει τι καινόν».
ex amicitia pax	peace from friendship	Often used on internal diplomatic event invitations. A motto sometimes inscribed on flags and mission plaques of diplomatic corps.
ex animo	from the soul	Sincerely.
ex ante	from before	Denoting "beforehand", "before the event", or "based on prior assumptions"; denoting a prediction.
Ex Astris Scientia	From the Stars, Knowledge	The motto of the fictional Starfleet Academy of Star Trek. Adapted from ex luna scientia, which in turn derived from ex scientia tridens.
ex cathedra	from the chair	A phrase applied to the declarations or promulgations of the Catholic Supreme Pontiff (Pope) when, preserved from the possibility of error by the Holy Spirit (see Papal infallibility), he solemnly declares or promulgates ("from the chair" that was the ancient symbol of the teacher and governor, in this case of the Church) a dogmatic doctrine on faith or morals as being contained in divine revelation, or at least being intimately connected to divine revelation. Used, by extension, of anyone who is perceived as speaking as though with supreme authority.
ex cultu robur	from culture [comes] strength	The motto of Cranleigh School, Surrey.
ex debito Justitia	justice, which cannot be denied	on King's writ, to be granted to the subject
ex Deo	from God	
ex dolo malo	from fraud	"From harmful deceit"; dolus malus is the Latin legal term denoting "fraud". The full legal phrase is ex dolo malo non oritur actio ("an action does not arise from fraud"). When an action has its origin in fraud or deceit, it cannot be supported; thus, a court of law will not assist a man who bases his course of action on an immoral or illegal act.
ex duris gloria	From suffering [comes] glory	Motto of Rapha Cycling club (see also Rapha (sportswear))
ex facie	from the face	Idiomatically rendered "on the face of it". A legal term typically used to state that a document's explicit terms are defective absent further investigation. Also, "contempt ex facie" means contempt of court committed outside of the court, as contrasted with contempt in facie.
ex factis jus oritur	the law arises from the facts	
ex fide fiducia	from faith [comes] confidence	Motto of St George's College, Harare and Hartmann House Preparatory School
ex fide fortis	from faith [comes] strength	Motto of Loyola School in New York City, New York, United States.
ex glande quercus	from the acorn the oak	Motto of the Municipal Borough of Southgate, London, England, United Kingdom.
ex gratia	from kindness	More literally "from grace". Refers to someone voluntarily performing an act purely from kindness, as opposed to for personal gain or from being compelled to do it. In law, an ex gratia payment is one made without recognizing any liability or obligation.
ex hypothesi	from the hypothesis	Denoting "by hypothesis"
ex ignorantia ad sapientiam; ex luce ad tenebras (e.i.)	from ignorance into wisdom; from light into darkness	Motto of the fictional Miskatonic University in Arkham, Massachusetts, from the Cthulhu Mythos
ex infra (e.i.)	"from below"	Recent academic notation denoting "from below in this writing".
ex injuria jus non oritur	law does not arise from injustice	a doctrine in international law where territorial changes arising from conquest are deemed illegal
ex juvantibus	from that which helps	The medical pitfall in which response to a therapeutic regimen substitutes proper diagnosis.
ex lege	from the law	
ex libris	from the books	Precedes a person's name, denoting "from the library of" the nominate; also a synonym for "bookplate".
ex luna scientia	from the moon, knowledge	The motto of the Apollo 13 lunar mission, derived from ex scientia tridens, the motto of Jim Lovell's alma mater, the United States Naval Academy
ex malo bonum	good out of evil	From Saint Augustine of Hippo, "Sermon LXI", in which he contradicts the dictum of Seneca the Younger in Epistulae morales ad Lucilium, 87:22: bonum ex malo non fit ("good does not come from evil"). Also the alias of the song "Miserabile Visu" by Anberlin in the album New Surrender.
ex mea sententia	in my opinion	
ex merito Justitiae	from merit, justice / justice from merit	The measure of justice is from the merit of the deed.
ex mero motu	out of mere impulse, or of one's own accord	
ex nihilo nihil fit	nothing comes from nothing	From Lucretius, and said earlier by Parmenides; in conjunction with "creation": creatio ex nihilo – "creation out of nothing"
ex novo	anew	something that has been newly made or made from scratch (see also de novo)
Ex Oblivione	from oblivion	The title of a short story by H. P. Lovecraft
ex officio	from the office	By virtue or right of office. Often used when someone holds one office by virtue of holding another: for example, the President of France is an ex officio Co-Prince of Andorra. A common misconception is that all ex officio members of a committee or congress may not vote; but in some cases they do. In law ex officio can also refer to an administrative or judicial office taking action of its own accord; in the latter case the more common term is ex proprio motu or ex meru motu, for example to invalidate a patent or prosecute infringers of copyright.
ex opere operantis	from the work of the one working	Theological phrase contrasted with ex opere operato, referring to the notion that the validity or promised benefit of a sacrament depends on the person administering it
ex opere operato	from the work worked	A theological phrase meaning that the act of receiving a sacrament actually confers the promised benefit, such as a baptism actually and literally cleansing one's sins. The Catholic Church affirms that the source of grace is God, not just the actions or disposition of the minister or the recipient of the sacrament.
ex oriente lux	light from the east	Originally refers to the sun rising in the east, but alludes to culture coming from the Eastern world. Motto of several institutions.
ex oriente pax	peace comes from the east (i.e. from the Soviet Union)	Shown on the logo as used by East Germany's CDU, a blue flag with two yellow stripes, a dove, and the CDU symbol in the center with the words ex oriente pax.
ex parte	from a part	A legal term that means "by one party" or "for one party". Thus, on behalf of one side or party only.
ex pede Herculem	from his foot, so Hercules	From the measure of Hercules' foot you shall know his size; from a part, the whole.
ex post	from after	"Afterward", "after the event". Based on knowledge of the past. Measure of past performance
ex post facto	from a thing done afterward	Said of a law with retroactive effect
ex professo	from one declaring [an art or science]	Or 'with due competence'. Said of the person who perfectly knows his art or science. Also used to mean "expressly".
ex proprio vigore	on its own	legal phrase; also in Insular Cases and elsewhere with the 'ex'.
ex rel., or, ex relatio	[arising] out of the relation/narration [of the relator]	The term is a legal phrase; the legal citation guide called the Bluebook describes ex rel. as a "procedural phrase" and requires using it to abbreviate "on the relation of", "for the use of", "on behalf of", and similar expressions. An example of use is in court case titles such as Universal Health Services, Inc. v. United States ex rel. Escobar.
ex scientia tridens	from knowledge, sea power	The United States Naval Academy motto. Refers to knowledge bringing men power over the sea comparable to that of the trident-bearing Greek god Poseidon.
ex scientia vera	from knowledge, truth	The motto of the College of Graduate Studies at Middle Tennessee State University.
ex silentio	from silence	In general, the claim that the absence of something demonstrates the proof of a proposition. An argumentum ex silentio ("argument from silence") is an argument based on the assumption that someone's silence on a matter suggests ("proves" when a logical fallacy) that person's ignorance of the matter or their inability to counterargue validly.
ex situ	out of position	opposite of "in situ"
ex solo ad solem	from the Earth to the Sun	The motto of the University of Central Lancashire, Preston
ex supra (e.s.)	"from above"	Recent academic notation for "from above in this writing".
ex tempore	from [this moment of] time	"This instant", "right away" or "immediately". Also written extempore
Ex turpi causa non oritur actio	From a dishonorable cause an action does not arise	A legal doctrine which states that a claimant will be unable to pursue a cause of action if it arises in connection with his own illegal act. Particularly relevant in the law of contract, tort and trusts.
ex umbra in solem	from the shadow into the light	Motto of Federico Santa María Technical University
ex undis	from the waves [of the sea]	motto in the coat of arms of Eemsmond
Ex Unitate Vires	from unity, strength / union is strength / unity is strength	Former motto of South Africa
ex vi termini	from the force of the term	Thus, "by definition"
ex vita discedo, tanquam ex hospitio, non tanquam ex domo	I depart from life as from an inn, not as from home	Cicero, Cato Maior de Senectute (On Old Age) 23
ex vivo	out of or from life	Used in reference to the study or assay of living tissue in an artificial environment outside the living organism.
ex voto	from the vow	Thus, in accordance with a promise. An ex voto is also an offering made in fulfillment of a vow.
ex vulgus scientia	from the crowd, knowledge	used to describe social computing, in The Wisdom of Crowds and discourse referring to it.
excelsior	higher	"Ever upward!" The state motto of New York. Also a catchphrase used by Marvel Comics head Stan Lee.
exceptio firmat (or probat) regulam in casibus non exceptis	The exception confirms the rule in cases which are not excepted	A juridical principle which means that the statement of a rule's exception (e.g., "no parking on Sundays") implicitly confirms the rule (i.e., that parking is allowed Monday through Saturday). Often mistranslated as "the exception that proves the rule".
excusatio non petita accusatio manifesta	an excuse that has not been sought [is] an obvious accusation	More loosely, "he who excuses himself, accuses himself"—an unprovoked excuse is a sign of guilt. In French, qui s'excuse, s'accuse
exeat	s/he may go out	A formal leave of absence
exegi monumentum aere perennius	I have reared a monument more enduring than bronze	Horace, Carmina III:XXX:I
exempli gratia (e.g.)	for example, for the sake of example	"For example" or "for the sake of example". The abbreviation "e.g." is often interpreted (Anglicised) as "example given". The plural exemplōrum gratiā to refer to multiple examples, separated by commas, is now not in frequent use.
exemplum virtutis	a model of virtue	
exercitus sine duce corpus est sine spiritu	an army without a leader is a body without a spirit	On a plaque at the former military staff building of the Swedish Armed Forces
exeunt	they leave	Third-person plural present active indicative of the Latin verb exire; also seen in exeunt omnes, "all leave"; singular: exit. Typically used as a stage direction in plays which means that one or more actors should leave the stage.
experientia docet	experience teaches	This term has been used in dermatopathology to express that there is no substitute for experience in dealing with all the numerous variations that may occur with skin conditions. The term has also been used in gastroenterology. It is also the motto of San Francisco State University.
experimentum crucis	experiment of the cross	Or "crucial experiment". A decisive test of a scientific theory.
experto crede	trust the expert	Literally "believe one who has had experience". An author's aside to the reader.
expressio unius est exclusio alterius	the expression of the one is the exclusion of the other	"Mentioning one thing may exclude another thing". A principle of legal statutory interpretation: the explicit presence of a thing implies intention to exclude others; e.g., a reference in the Poor Relief Act 1601 to "lands, houses, tithes and coal mines" was held to exclude mines other than coal mines. Sometimes expressed as expressum facit cessare tacitum (broadly, "the expression of one thing excludes the implication of something else").
extra domum	[placed] outside of the house	Refers to a possible result of Catholic ecclesiastical legal proceedings when the culprit is removed from being part of a group like a monastery.
extra Ecclesiam nulla salus	outside the Church [there is] no salvation	This expression comes from the Epistle to Jubaianus, paragraph 21, written by Saint Cyprian of Carthage, a bishop of the third century. It is often used to summarise the doctrine that the Catholic Church is absolutely necessary for salvation.
extra omnes	outside, all [of you]	It is issued by the Master of the Papal Liturgical Celebrations before a session of the papal conclave which will elect a new pope. When spoken, all those who are not cardinals, or those otherwise mandated to be present at the conclave, must leave the Sistine Chapel.
extra territorium jus dicenti impune non paretur	he who administers justice outside of his territory is disobeyed with impunity	Refers to extraterritorial jurisdiction. Often cited in law of the sea cases on the high seas.
extrema ratio	extreme solution	last possibility, last possible course of action

== F ==
Latin	Translation	Notes
faber est suae quisque fortunae	every man is the artisan of his own fortune	Appius Claudius Caecus; motto of Fort Street High School in Petersham, Sydney, Australia
fac et spera	do and hope	motto of Clan Matheson
fac fortia et patere	do brave deeds and endure	motto of Prince Alfred College in Adelaide, Australia
fac simile	make a similar thing	origin of the word facsimile, and, through it, of fax
faciam eos in gentem unam	I will make them into one nation	appeared on British coinage following the Union of the Crowns
faciam quodlibet quod necesse est	I'll do whatever it takes	
faciam ut mei memineris	I'll make you remember me	from Plautus, Persa IV.3–24; used by Russian hooligans as tattoo inscription
facile princeps	easily the first	said of the acknowledged leader in some field, especially in the arts and humanities
facilius est multa facere quam diu	It is easier to do many things, than one thing consecutively	Quintilian, Institutio Oratoria 1/12:7
facio liberos ex liberis libris libraque	"I make free adults out of children by means of books and a balance."	motto of St. John's College in Annapolis, Maryland, and Santa Fe, New Mexico
facta, non verba	deeds, not words	Frequently used as motto
factum fieri infectum non potest	It is impossible for a deed to be undone	Terence, Phormio 5/8:45
falsus in uno, falsus in omnibus	false in one, false in all	A Roman legal principle indicating that a witness who willfully falsifies one matter is not credible on any matter. The underlying motive for attorneys to impeach opposing witnesses in court: the principle discredits the rest of their testimony if it is without corroboration.
familia supra omnia	family over everything	frequently used as a family motto
fas est et ab hoste doceri	It is lawful to be taught even by an enemy	Ovid, Metamorphoses 4:428
Fatetur facinus qui judicium fugit	He who flies from justice acknowledges himself a criminal.	Under such circumstances the presumption is one of guilt.
febris amatoria	fever of love	Hypochromic anemia or chlorosis, once described as the "fever of love", which was believed to stem from the yearning for passion in virgins. First written about in 1554 by the German physician Johannes Lange. Also known as "Disease of the Virgins".
feci quod potui, faciant meliora potentes	I have done what I could; let those who can do better.	Slight variant ("quod potui feci") found in James Boswell's An Account of Corsica, there described as "a simple beautiful inscription on the front of Palazzo Tolomei at Siena". Later, found in Henry Baerlein's introduction to his translation of The Diwan of Abul ʿAla by Abul ʿAla Al-Maʿarri (973–1057); also in Anton Chekhov's Three Sisters, act 1. Also in Alfonso Moreno Espinosa, Compendio de Historia Universal, 5. ed. (Cádiz 1888).
NN fecit	NN made (this)	a formula used traditionally in the author's signature by painters, sculptors, artisans, scribes etc.; compare pinxit
fecisti patriam diversis de gentibus unam	"From differing peoples you have made one native land"	Verse 63 from the poem De reditu suo by Rutilius Claudius Namatianus praising emperor Augustus.
felicior Augusto, melior Traiano	"be more fortunate than Augustus and better than Trajan"	ritual acclamation delivered to late Roman emperors
Felicitas, Integritas et Sapientia	Happiness, Integrity and Knowledge	The motto of Oakland Colegio Campestre school through which Colombia participates of NASA Educational Programs
felix culpa	fortunate fault	from the "Exsultet" of the Catholic liturgy for the Easter Vigil
felix qui potuit rerum cognoscere causas	happy is he who can ascertain the causes of things	Virgil. "Rerum cognoscere causas" is the motto of the London School of Economics, University of Sheffield, and University of Guelph.
felo de se	felon from himself	archaic legal term for one who commits suicide, referring to early English common law punishments, such as land seizure, inflicted on those who killed themselves
fere libenter homines id quod volunt credunt	men generally believe what they want to	People's beliefs are shaped largely by their desires. Julius Caesar, The Gallic War 3.18
festina lente	hurry slowly	An oxymoronic motto of Augustus. It encourages proceeding quickly, but calmly and cautiously. Equivalent to "more haste, less speed". Motto of the Madeira School, McLean, Virginia and Berkhamsted School, Berkhamsted, England, United Kingdom
festinare nocet, nocet et cunctatio saepe; tempore quaeque suo qui facit, ille sapit.	it is bad to hurry, and delay is often as bad; the wise person is the one who does everything in its proper time.	Ovid
fex urbis lex orbis	dregs [classical Latin faex] of the city, law of the world	attributed to Saint Jerome by Victor Hugo in Les Misérables
fiat	Arbitrary or authoritative command or order to do something; an effectual decree	3rd-person singular present passive subjunctive from Latin facio
fiat justitia	"Let justice be done"	warrant, petition; motto of several institutions
fiat iustitia, et pereat mundus	let justice be done, even if the world should perish	motto of Ferdinand I, Holy Roman Emperor
fiat justitia ruat caelum	let justice be done, even if the sky should fall	attributed to Lucius Calpurnius Piso Caesoninus
fiat lux	let there be light	from the Genesis, "dixitque Deus fiat lux et facta est lux" ("and God said: 'Let there be light', and there was light."); frequently used as the motto of schools.
fiat mihi secundum verbum tuum	be it done to me according to thy word	Virgin Mary's response to the Annunciation
fiat panis	let there be bread	Motto of the United Nations Food and Agriculture Organization (FAO)
fiat voluntas Dei	May God's will be done	motto of Robert May's School; see the next phrase below
fiat voluntas tua	Thy will be done	Quotation of the third petition of the Pater Noster (Our Father) prayer dictated by Jesus Christ and his response to the Father during the Agony in the Garden of Gethsemane; motto of Archbishop Richard Smith of the Roman Catholic Archdiocese of Edmonton.
ficta voluptatis causa sint proxima veris	fictions meant to please should approximate the truth	Horace, Ars Poetica (338)
Fidei Defensor (Fid Def) or (fd)	Defender of the Faith	A title given to King Henry VIII of England by Pope Leo X on 17 October 1521, before Henry broke from the Roman Church and founded the Church of England. British monarchs continue to use the title, which is still inscribed on all British coins, and usually abbreviated.
fide et virtute	by fidelity and valor	motto of Kingswood College, Kandy
fidem scit	he knows the faith	sometimes mistranslated to "keep the faith" when used in contemporary English writings of all kinds to convey a light-hearted wish for the reader's well-being
fides qua creditur	the faith by which it is believed	Roman Catholic theological term for the personal faith that apprehends what is believed, contrasted with fides quae creditur, which is what is believed; see next phrase below
fides quae creditur	the faith which is believed	Roman Catholic theological term for the content and truths of the Faith or "the deposit of the Faith", contrasted with fides qua creditur, which is the personal faith by which the Faith is believed; see previous phrase
fides quaerens intellectum	faith seeking understanding	motto of St. Anselm; Proslogion
fidus Achates	faithful Achates	refers to a faithful friend; from the name of Aeneas's faithful companion in Virgil's Aeneid
filiae nostrae sicut anguli incisi similitudine templi	may our daughters be as polished as the corners of the temple	motto of Francis Holland School
finis coronat opus	the end crowns the work	A major part of a work is properly finishing it. Motto of Poole Grammar School in Dorset, UK; St. Mary's Catholic High School in Dubai, United Arab Emirates; on the coat of arms of Seychelles; and of the Amin Investment Bank
finis origine pendet	the end depends upon the beginning	one of the mottos of Phillips Academy
finis vitae sed non amoris	the end of life, but not of love	unknown
flagellum dei	the scourge of God	title for Attila the Hun, the ruthless invader of the Western Roman Empire
flatus vocis	[a or the] breath of voice	a mere name, word, or sound without a corresponding objective reality; expression used by the nominalists of universals and traditionally attributed to the medieval philosopher Roscelin of Compiègne
flectere si nequeo superos, Acheronta movebo	if I can not reach Heaven I will raise Hell	Virgil, Aeneid, Book VII.312
floreat Etona	may Eton flourish	Motto of Eton College, England, United Kingdom
floreat nostra schola	may our school flourish	a common scholastic motto
floreat pica	may the Magpie flourish	Motto of Collingwood Football Club
floruit (fl.)	one flourished	indicates a date on which a person is known to have been alive, often the period when a historic person was most active or was accomplishing that for which he is famous; may be used as a substitute when the dates of his birth and/or death are unknown.
fluctuat nec mergitur	it is tossed by the waves but does not founder	Motto of the City of Paris, France
fons et origo	the spring and source	also: "the fountainhead and beginning"
fons sapientiae, verbum Dei	the fount of knowledge is the word of God	motto of Bishop Blanchet High School
fons vitae caritas	love is the fountain of life	motto of Chisipite Senior School and Chisipite Junior School
formosam resonare doces Amaryllida silvas	teach the woods to re-echo "fair Amaryllis"	Virgil, Eclogues, 1:5
formosum pastor Corydon ardebat Alexin	the shepherd Corydon burned with love for the handsome Alexis	Virgil, Eclogues, 2:1. Highlighted by various authors (Richard Barnfield, Lord Byron) as a reference to same-sex love. Also Alexim.
forsan et haec olim meminisse iuvabit	perhaps even these things will be good to remember one day	Virgil, Aeneid, Book 1, Line 203
fortes fortuna adiuvat	Fortune favors the bold or Fortune favors the brave	From Terence's comedy play Phormio, line 203. Also spelled as fortis fortuna adiuvat. The motto of HMS Brave and USS Florida.
fortes fortuna iuvat	Fortune favors the brave	From the letters of Pliny the Younger, Book 6, Letter 16. Often quoted as fortes fortuna juvat. The motto of the Jutland Dragoon Regiment of Denmark.
fortes in fide	strong in faith	a common motto
fortis cadere, cedere non potest	the brave may fall, but can not yield	motto on the coat of arms of the Fahnestock Family and of the Palmetto Guard of Charleston, South Carolina
fortis est veritas	truth is strong	motto on the coat of arms of Oxford, England, United Kingdom
fortis et liber	strong and free	motto of Alberta, Canada
fortis in arduis	strong in difficulties/adversary	motto of the Municipal Borough of Middleton, from the Earl of Middleton and of Syed Ahmad Shaheed House of Army Burn Hall College in Abbottabad, Pakistan
fortiter et fideliter	bravely and faithfully	a common motto
fortiter in re, suaviter in modo	resolute in execution, gentle in manner	a common motto
fortius quo fidelius	strength through loyalty	Motto of St Kilda Football Club
fortunae meae, multorum faber	artisan of my fate and that of several others	motto of Gatineau
fraus omnia vitiat	fraud vitiates everything	a legal principle: the occurrence or taint of fraud in a (legal) transaction entirely invalidates it
Frustra legis auxilium quaerit qui in legem committit	in vain does he who offends the law seek the law's aid	a legal principle: one cannot invoke the law to assist in an illegal purpose. Inscribed on the facade of the Quebec Court of Appeal in Montreal.
fui quod es, eris quod sum	I once was what you are, you will be what I am	An epitaph that reminds the reader of the inevitability of death, as if to state: "Once I was alive like you are, and you will be dead as I am now." It was carved on the gravestones of some Roman military officers.
fumus boni iuris	presumption of sufficient legal basis	a legal principle
fundamenta inconcussa	unshakable foundation	

== G ==
Latin	Translation	Notes
Gallia est omnis divisa in partes tres	all Gaul is divided into three parts	the celebrated opening line of Julius Caesar's Commentaries on the Gallic War
gaudia certaminis	the joys of battle	according to Cassiodorus, an expression used by Attila in addressing his troops prior to the 451 Battle of Châlons
gaudeamus hodie	let us rejoice today	
gaudeamus igitur	therefore let us rejoice	First words of an academic anthem used, among other places, in The Student Prince.
gaudete in domino	rejoice in the Lord	Motto of Bishop Allen Academy
gaudium in veritate	joy in truth	Motto of Campion School
generalia specialibus non derogant	general provisions enacted in later legislation do not detract from specific provisions enacted in earlier legislation	A principle of statutory interpretation: If a matter falls under a specific provision in a statute enacted before a general provision enacted in a later statute, it is to be presumed that the legislature did not intend that the earlier specific provision be repealed, and the matter is governed by the earlier specific provision, not the more recent general one.
genius loci	spirit of place	The unique, distinctive aspects or atmosphere of a place, such as those celebrated in art, stories, folk tales, and festivals. Originally, the genius loci was literally the protective spirit of a place, a creature usually depicted as a snake.
generatim discite cultus	Learn each field of study according to its kind. (Virgil, Georgics II.)	Motto of the University of Bath.
gens una sumus	we are one people	Motto of FIDE. Can be traced back to Claudian's poem De consulatu Stilichonis.
gesta non verba	deeds, not words	Motto of James Ruse Agricultural High School.
Gloria in excelsis Deo	Glory to God in the Highest	Often translated "Glory to God on High". The title and beginning of an ancient Roman Catholic doxology, the Greater Doxology. See also ad maiorem Dei gloriam.
Gloria invidiam vicisti	By your fame you have conquered envy	Sallust, Bellum Jugurthum ("Jugurthine War") 10:2.
gloria filiorum patres	The glory of sons is their fathers (Proverbs17:6)	Motto of Eltham College
Gloria Patri	Glory to the Father	The beginning of the Lesser Doxology.
gloriosus et liber	glorious and free	Motto of Manitoba
gradatim ferociter	by degrees, ferociously	Motto of private spaceflight company Blue Origin, which officially treats "Step by step, ferociously" as the English translation
gradibus ascendimus	ascending by degrees	Motto of Grey College, Durham
Graecia capta ferum victorem cepit	Conquered Greece in turn defeated its savage conqueror	Horace Epistles 2.1
Graecum est; non legitur	It is Greek (and therefore) it cannot be read.	Most commonly from Shakespeare's Julius Caesar where Casca couldn't explain to Cassius what Cicero was saying because he was speaking Greek. The more common colloquialism would be: It's all Greek to me.
grandescunt aucta labore	By hard work, all things increase and grow	Motto of McGill University
gratia et scientia	grace and learning	Motto of Arundel School
gratiae veritas naturae	Truth through mercy and nature	Motto of Uppsala University
graviora manent	heavier things remain	Virgil Aeneid 6:84; more severe things await, the worst is yet to come
Gravis Dulcis Immutabilis	serious sweet immutable	Title of a poem by James Elroy Flecker
gutta cavat lapidem [non vi sed saepe cadendo]	a water drop hollows a stone [not by force, but by falling often]	main phrase is from Ovid, Epistulae ex Ponto IV, 10, 5.; expanded in the Middle Ages

== H ==
Latin	Translation	Notes
habeas corpus	[we command] that you have the body [brought up]	A legal term from the 14th century or earlier. Refers to a number of legal writs requiring a jailer to bring a prisoner in person (hence corpus) before a court or judge, most commonly habeas corpus ad subjiciendum ("that you have the body [brought up] for the purpose of subjecting [the case to examination]"). Commonly used as the general term for a prisoner's legal right to challenge the legality of their detention.
habemus papam	we have a pope	Used after a Catholic Church papal election to announce publicly a successful ballot to elect a new pope.
habent sua fata libelli	Books have their destiny [according to the capabilities of the reader]	Terentianus Maurus, De litteris, de syllabis, de metris, 1:1286.
hac lege	with this law	
haec olim meminisse iuvabit	one day, this will be pleasing to remember	Commonly rendered in English as "One day, we'll look back on this and smile". From Virgil's Aeneid 1.203. Also, motto of Handsworth Grammar School, and the Jefferson Society.
haec ornamenta mea [sunt]	"These are my ornaments" or "These are my jewels"	Attributed to Cornelia Africana (talking about her children) by Valerius Maximus in Factorum ac dictorum memorabilium libri IX, IV, 4, incipit.
Hannibal ad portas	Hannibal at the gates	Found in Cicero's first Philippic and in Livy's Ab urbe condita Hannibal was a fierce enemy of Rome who almost brought them to defeat. Sometimes rendered "Hannibal ante portas", with similar meaning: "Hannibal before the gates"
haud ignota loquor	I speak not of unknown things	Thus, "I say no things that are unknown". From Virgil's Aeneid, 2.91.
Hei mihi! quod nullis amor est medicabilis herbis.	Oh me! love can not be cured by herbs	From Ovid's Metamorphoses, I, 523.
hic abundant leones	here lions abound	Written on uncharted territories of old maps; see also: here be dragons.
hic et nunc	here and now	The imperative motto for the satisfaction of desire. "I need it, Here and Now"
hic et ubique	here and everywhere	
hic jacet (HJ)	here lies	Also rendered hic iacet. Written on gravestones or tombs, preceding the name of the deceased. Equivalent to hic sepultus (here is buried), and sometimes combined into hic jacet sepultus (HJS), "here lies buried".
hic locus est ubi mors gaudet succurrere vitae	This is the place where death delights in helping life	A motto of many morgues or wards of anatomical pathology.
hic manebimus optime	here we will remain most excellently	According to Titus Livius the phrase was pronounced by Marcus Furius Camillus, addressing the senators who intended to abandon the city, invaded by Gauls, circa 390 BC. It is used today to express the intent to keep one's position, even if the circumstances appear adverse.
hic mortui vivunt et muti loquuntur	here the dead live and the mute speak	inscription on several libraries
hic Rhodus, hic salta	Here is Rhodes, jump here	From the Latin version of "The Boastful Athlete" in Aesop's Fables as formulated by Erasmus in his Adagia. An athlete brags about his impressive jump at a past event in Rhodes, whereupon he is challenged to reproduce it then and there, not merely boast. In other words, prove what you can do, here and now. Cited by Hegel and Marx.
hic sunt dracones	here there are dragons	Written on a globe engraved on two conjoined halves of ostrich eggs, dated to 1504.
hic sunt leones	here there are lions	Written on uncharted territories of old maps.
hinc et inde	from both sides	
hinc illae lacrimae	hence those tears	From Terence, Andria, act 1, line 126. Originally literal, referring to the tears shed by Pamphilus at the funeral of Chrysis, it came to be used proverbially in the works of later authors, such as Horace (Epistulae 1.XIX:41).
hinc itur ad astra	from here the way leads to the stars	Written on the wall of the old astronomical observatory of Vilnius University, Lithuania, and the university's motto.
hinc robur et securitas	herefore strength and safety	Motto of the Central Bank of Sweden.
historia vitae magistra	history, the teacher of life	From Cicero's De Oratore, II, 9. Also "history is the mistress of life".
hoc age	do this	Motto of Bradford Grammar School
hoc est bellum	This is war	
hoc est Christum cognoscere, beneficia eius cognoscere	To know Christ is to know his benefits	Famous dictum by the Reformer Melanchthon in his Loci Communes of 1521
hoc est enim corpus meum	For this is my Body	The words of Jesus reiterated in Latin during the Roman Catholic Eucharist. Sometimes simply written as Hoc est corpus meum or "This is my body".
hoc genus omne	All that crowd/people	From Horace's Satires, 1/2:2. Refers to the crowd at Tigellio's funeral (c. 40–39 BC). Not to be confused with et hoc genus omne (English: and all that sort of thing).
hodie mihi, cras tibi	Today for me, tomorrow for you	Inscription that can be seen on tombstones dating from the Middle Ages, meant to outline the ephemerality of life.
hominem pagina nostra sapit	It is of man that my page smells	From Martial's Epigrams, Book 10, No. 4, Line 10; stating his purpose in writing.
hominem non morbum cura	Treat the man, not the disease	Motto of the Far Eastern University – Institute of Nursing
homo bulla	man is a bubble	Varro (116 BC – 27 BC), in the opening line of the first book of Rerum Rusticarum Libri Tres, wrote quod, ut dicitur, si est homo bulla, eo magis senex (for if, as they say, man is a bubble, all the more so is an old man) later reintroduced by Erasmus in his Adagia, a collection of sayings published in 1572.
homo homini lupus	man [is a] wolf to man	First attested in Plautus' Asinaria (lupus est homo homini). The sentence was drawn on by Thomas Hobbes in De Cive as a concise expression of his views on human nature.
Homo minister et interpres naturae	Man, the servant and interpreter of nature	Motto of the Lehigh University
homo praesumitur bonus donec probetur malus	One is innocent until proven guilty	See also: presumption of innocence.
homo sine pecunia imago mortis	a man without money is the image of death	
Homo sum, humani nihil a me alienum puto	I am a human being; I think that nothing human is strange to me	From Terence's Heauton Timorumenos (The Self-Tormentor) (163 BC). Originally "strange" or "foreign" (alienum) was used in the sense of "irrelevant", as this line was a response to the speaker being told to mind his own business, but it is now commonly used to advocate respecting different cultures and being humane in general.
homo unius libri	a man of a single book	Attributed to Thomas Aquinas: «Hominem unius libri timeo» “I fear a man of a single book.”
honestas ante honores	honesty before glory	Motto of King George V School, Hong Kong
honor et virtus post morte floret	honesty and virtue flourish after death	inscribed in the stonework in Paolo Veronese's (1565 c.) Painting Allegory of Virtue and Vice
honor virtutis praemium	esteem is the reward of virtue	Motto of Arnold School, Blackpool, England
honoris causa	for the sake of honor	Said of an honorary title, such as "Doctor of Science honoris causa"
hora fugit	the hour flees	See tempus fugit
hora somni (h.s.)	at the hour of sleep	Medical shorthand for "at bedtime"
horas non numero nisi serenas	I do not count the hours unless they are sunny	A common inscription on sundials.
horresco referens	I shudder as I tell	From Virgil's Aeneid, 2.204, on the appearance of the sea-serpents who kill the Trojan priest Laocoön and his sons
horribile dictu	horrible to say	cf. mirabile dictu
horror vacui	fear of the empty	phenomenon in art and hypothesis in philosophy
hortus in urbe	A garden in the city	Motto of the Chicago Park District, a playful allusion to the city's motto, urbs in horto, q.v.
hortus siccus	A dry garden	A collection of dry, preserved plants
hostis humani generis	enemy of the human race	Cicero defined pirates in Roman law as being enemies of humanity in general.
humilitas occidit superbiam	humility conquers pride	
hypotheses non fingo	I do not fabricate hypotheses	From Newton, Principia. Less literally, "I do not assert that any hypotheses are true".

== I ==
Latin	Translation	Notes
I, Vitelli, dei Romani sono belli	Go, O Vitellius, at the war sound of the Roman god	Perfectly correct Latin sentence usually reported as funny by modern Italians because the same exact words, in Italian, mean "Romans' calves are beautiful", which has a ridiculously different meaning.
ibidem (ibid.)	in the same place	Usually used in bibliographic citations to refer to the last source previously referenced.
id est (i.e.)	that is (literally "it is")	"That is (to say)" in the sense of "that means" and "which means", or "in other words", "namely", or sometimes "in this case", depending on the context.
id quod plerumque accidit	that which generally happens	Phrase used in legal language to indicate the most probable outcome from an act, fact, event or cause
idem (id.)	the same	Used to refer to something that has already been cited; ditto. See also ibidem.
idem quod (i.q.)	the same as	Not to be confused with an intelligence quotient.
Idus Martiae	the Ides of March	In the Roman calendar, the Ides of March refers to the 15th day of March. In modern times, the term is best known as the date on which Julius Caesar was assassinated in 44 BC; the term has come to be used as a metaphor for impending doom.
Jesu juva (J.J.)	Jesus, help!	Used by Johann Sebastian Bach at the beginning of his compositions, which he ended with "S.D.G." (Soli Deo gloria). Compare Besiyata Dishmaya.
Iesus Nazarenus Rex Iudaeorum (INRI)	Jesus the Nazarene, King of the Jews	From Vulgate; John 19:19. John 19:20 states that this inscription was written in three languages—Aramaic, Latin and Greek—at the top of the cross during the crucifixion of Jesus.
igitur qui desiderat pacem, praeparet bellum	Therefore whoever desires peace, let him prepare for war	Publius Flavius Vegetius Renatus, De re militari; similar to si vis pacem, para bellum and in pace ut sapiens aptarit idonea bello.
igne natura renovatur integra	through fire, nature is reborn whole	An alchemical aphorism invented as an alternate meaning for the acronym INRI.
igni ferroque	with fire and iron	Phrase describing scorched earth tactics. Also rendered as igne atque ferro, ferro ignique, and other variations.
ignis aurum probat	fire tests gold	Phrase referring to the refining of character through difficult circumstances
ignis fatuus	foolish fire	Will-o'-the-wisp.
ignorantia juris non excusat (or ignorantia legis non excusat or ignorantia legis neminem excusat)	ignorance of the law is no excuse	Legal principle whereby ignorance of a law does not allow one to escape liability
ignoratio elenchi	ignorance of the issue	The logical fallacy of irrelevant conclusion: making an argument that, while possibly valid, doesn't prove or support the proposition it claims to. An ignoratio elenchi that is an intentional attempt to mislead or confuse the opposing party is known as a red herring. Elenchi is from the Greek elenchos.
ignotum per ignotius	unknown by means of the more unknown	An explanation that is less clear than the thing to be explained. Synonymous with obscurum per obscurius.
ignotus (ign.)	unknown	
illum oportet crescere me autem minui	He must become greater; I must become less	In the Gospel of John 3:30, a phrase said by John the Baptist after baptizing Jesus. Motto of Saint John the Baptist Catholic School, San Juan, Metro Manila.
imago Dei	image of God	From the religious concept that man was created in "God's image".
imitatio dei	imitation of a god	A principle, held by several religions, that believers should strive to resemble their god(s).
imperium in imperio	an order within an order	1. Group of people who owe utmost fealty to their leader(s), subordinating the interests of the larger group to the authority of the internal group's leader(s).; 2. A "fifth column" organization operating against the organization within which they seemingly reside.; 3. "State within a state"
imperium sine fine	an empire without an end	In Virgil's Aeneid, Jupiter ordered Aeneas to found a city (Rome) from which would come an everlasting, never-ending empire, the endless (sine fine) empire.
impossibilium nulla obligatio est	there is no obligation to do the impossible	Publius Juventius Celsus, Digesta L 17, 185.
imprimatur	let it be printed	An authorization to publish, granted by some censoring authority (originally a Catholic bishop).
in absentia	in the absence	Used in a number of situations, such as in a trial carried out in the absence of the accused.
in absentia lucis, tenebrae vincunt	in the absence of light, darkness prevails	
in actu	in act	In the very act; in reality.
[Dominica] in albis [depositis]	[Sunday in Setting Aside the] White Garments	Latin name of the Octave of Easter.
in articulo mortis	at the point of death	
in bono veritas	truth is in the good	
in camera	in the chamber	In secret. See also camera obscura.
in casu (i.c.)	in the event	In this case.
in cauda venenum	the poison is in the tail	Using the metaphor of a scorpion, this can be said of an account that proceeds gently, but turns vicious towards the end—or more generally waits till the end to reveal an intention or statement that is undesirable in the listener's ears.
in com. Ebor.	In the county of Yorkshire	Abbreviation of in comitatu Eboraci. Eboracum was the Roman name for York and this phrase is used in some Georgian and Victorian books on the genealogy of prominent Yorkshire families.
in Christi lumine pro mundi vita	in the light of Christ for the life on the world	Motto of the Pontifical Catholic University of Chile.
incurvatus in se	turned/curved inward on oneself	
in defensum castitatis	in defence of chastity	Used in reference to the deaths of some Christian martyrs in Catholicism
in Deo speramus	in God we hope	Motto of Brown University.
in dubio pro reo	in doubt, on behalf of the [alleged] culprit	Expresses the judicial principle that in case of doubt the decision must be in favor of the accused (in that anyone is innocent until there is proof to the contrary).
in duplo	in double	In duplicate
in effigie	in the likeness	In (the form of) an image; in effigy (as opposed to "in the flesh" or "in person").
in esse	in existence	In actual existence; as opposed to in posse.
in extenso	in the extended	In full; at full length; complete or unabridged
in extremis	in the furthest reaches	At the very end. In extremity; in dire straits; also "at the point of death" (cf. in articulo mortis).
in facie	in the face	Refers to contempt of court committed in open court in front of the judge; contrast ex facie.
in fide scientiam	To our faith add knowledge	Motto of Newington College.
in fidem	into faith	To the verification of faith.
in fieri	in becoming	In progress; pending.
in fine (i.f.)	in the end	At the end. Used in footnotes, for example, "p. 157 in fine": "the end of page 157".
in flagrante delicto	in a blazing wrong, while the crime is blazing	Caught in the act (esp. a crime or in a "compromising position"); equivalent to "caught red-handed" in English idiom.
in flore	in blossom	Blooming.
in foro	in forum	In court (legal term).
in forma pauperis	in the character or manner of a pauper	
in girum imus nocte et consumimur igni	We enter the circle at night and are consumed by fire	A palindrome said to describe the behavior of moths. Also the title of a film by Guy Debord.
in harmonia progressio	progress in harmony	Motto of Bandung Institute of Technology, Indonesia.
in hoc sensu, or in sensu hoc (s.h.)	in this sense	Recent academic abbreviation for "in this sense".
in hoc signo vinces	by this sign you will conquer	Words which Constantine the Great claimed to have seen in a vision before the Battle of the Milvian Bridge.
in hunc effectum	for this purpose	Describes a meeting called for a particular stated purpose only.
in ictu oculi	in the blink of an eye	
in illo ordine (i.o.)	in that order	Recent academic substitution for the spacious and inconvenient "..., respectively".
in illo tempore	in that time	At that time, or in those days, often used at the start of a liturgical scripture reading to mark an undetermined time in the past or to replace contextual material which is not being read.
in inceptum finis est	lit.: in the beginning is the end	or: the beginning foreshadows the end
in limine	at the outset/threshold	Preliminary, in law, a motion in limine is a motion that is made to the judge before or during trial, often about the admissibility of evidence believed prejudicial.
in loco	in the place, on the spot	That is, 'on site', e.g. "The nearby labs were closed for the weekend, so the water samples were analyzed in loco."
in loco parentis	in the place of a parent	Assuming parental or custodial responsibility and authority (e.g., schoolteachers over students); a legal term.
in luce Tua videmus lucem	in Thy light we see light	Motto of Valparaiso University. The phrase comes from Psalm 36:9: "For with you is the fountain of life; in your light we see light."
in lumine tuo videbimus lumen	in your light we will see the light	Motto of Columbia University New York City, Presbyterian Boys' Senior High School Ghana, Ohio Wesleyan University, University of Fort Hare South Africa
in manus tuas commendo spiritum meum	into your hands I entrust my spirit	According to Luke 23:46, the last words of Jesus on the cross
in medias res	into the middle of things	From Horace. Refers to the literary technique of beginning a narrative in the middle of, or at a late point in, the story, after much action has already taken place. Examples include the Iliad, the Odyssey, Os Lusíadas, Othello, and Paradise Lost. Compare ab initio.
in memoriam	into the memory	Equivalent to "in the memory of". Refers to remembering or honoring a deceased person.
in natura	in nature	
in necessariis unitas, in dubiis libertas, in omnibus caritas	in necessary things unity, in doubtful things liberty, in all things charity	"Charity" (caritas) is being used in the classical sense of "compassion" (cf. agape). Motto of the Cartellverband der katholischen deutschen Studentenverbindungen. Often misattributed to Augustine of Hippo.
in nocte consilium	advice comes in the night; "sleep on it"	Motto of Birkbeck College, University of London, an evening higher-education institution
in nomine diaboli	in the name of the devil	
in nomine Domini	in the name of the Lord	Motto of Trinity College, Perth, Australia; the name of a 1050 papal bull
in nomine patris, et filii, et spiritus sancti	in the name of the Father, and of the Son, and of the Holy Spirit	Invocation of the Holy Trinity; part of the Latin Mass
in nuce	in a nut	in a nutshell; briefly stated; potential; in the embryonic phase
in odium fidei	in hatred of the faith	Used in reference to the deaths of some Christian martyrs in Catholicism
in omnia paratus	ready for anything	Motto of the United States Army's 18th Infantry Regiment
in omnibus amare et servire Domino	in everything, love and serve the Lord	The motto of Ateneo de Iloilo, a school in the Philippines
in omnibus requiem quaesivi, et nusquam inveni nisi in angulo cum libro	Everywhere I have searched for peace and nowhere found it, except in a corner with a book	Quote by Thomas à Kempis
in ovo	in the egg	An experiment or process performed in an egg or embryo (e.g. in ovo electroporation of chicken embryo).
in pace ut sapiens aptarit idonea bello	in peace, like the wise man, make preparations for war	Horace, Satires 2/2:111; similar to si vis pacem, para bellum and igitur qui desiderat pacem, praeparet bellum.
in pace requiescat	in peace may he rest	Alternate form of requiescat in pace ("let him rest in peace"). Found in this form at the end of The Cask of Amontillado by Edgar Allan Poe.
in pari materia	upon the same matter or subject	In statutory interpretation, when a statute is ambiguous, its meaning may be determined in light of other statutes on the same subject matter.
in pari delicto	in equal fault	
in partibus infidelium	in the parts of the infidels	"In the land of the infidels"; used to refer to bishoprics that remain as titular sees even after the corresponding territory was conquered, usually by Muslim rulers.
in pectore	in the heart	A cardinal named in secret by the pope. See also ab imo pectore.
in personam	against a person	Directed towards a particular person
in posse	in potential	In the state of being possible; as opposed to in esse.
in propria persona	in one's own person	For one's self, for the sake of one's personhood; acting on one's own behalf, especially a person representing themselves in a legal proceeding; abbreviated pro per. See also pro se: litigant in person, pro se legal representation in the United States.
in principio erat Verbum	in the beginning was the Word (Logos)	Beginning of the Gospel of John
in re	in the matter [of]	Legal term used to indicate that a judicial proceeding may not have formally designated adverse parties or is otherwise uncontested. The term is commonly used in case citations of probate proceedings, for example, In re Smith's Estate; it is also used in juvenile courts, as, for instance, In re Gault.
in rebus	in the thing [itself]	Primarily of philosophical use to discuss properties and property exemplification. In philosophy of mathematics, it is typically contrasted with "ante rem" and, more recently, "post res" structuralism. Sometimes in re is used in place of in rebus.
in regione caecorum rex est luscus	In the land of the blind, the one-eyed man is king.	Quote of Desiderius Erasmus from Adagia (first published 1500, with numerous expanded editions through 1536), III, IV, 96.
in rem	against the thing	Legal term indicating a court's jurisdiction over a piece of property rather than a legal person; contrast with personal (ad personam) jurisdiction. See In rem jurisdiction; Quasi in rem jurisdiction
in rerum natura	in the nature of things	See also Lucretius' De rerum natura (On the Nature of Things).
in retentis	among things held back	Used to describe documents kept separately from the regular records of a court for special reasons.
in saecula (saeculorum), in saeculum saeculi	roughly: down to the times of the times	forever (and ever); liturgical
in saeculo	in the times	In the secular world, esp. outside a monastery, or before death.
in salvo	in safety	
in scientia et virtue	in knowledge and virtue	Motto of St. Joseph's College, Colombo, Colombo. Sri Lanka
in se magna ruunt	great things collapse of their own weight	Lucan, Pharsalia 1:81
in silvam non ligna feras	Do not carry wood to the forest	Horace, Satires 1:10
in situ	in the place	In the original place, appropriate position, or natural arrangement.
in somnis veritas	In dreams there is truth	
in spe	in hope	"future" ("my mother-in-law in spe", i.e. "my future mother-in-law"), or "in embryonic form", as in "Locke's theory of government resembles, in spe, Montesquieu's theory of the separation of powers."
in specialibus generalia quaerimus	To seek the general in the specifics	That is, to understand the most general rules through the most detailed analysis.
in statu nascendi	in the state of being born	Just as something is about to begin
in theatro ludus	like a scene in a play	Surreal
in toto	in all	Totally; entirely; completely.
in triplo	in triple	In triplicate.
in umbra, igitur, pugnabimus	Then we will fight in the shade	Laconic phrase supposedly given by the Spartans in response to the Persian boast at the Battle of Thermopylae that their arrows would obscure the sun. The response, though not in this form, was variously attributed to the soldier Dienekes or to King Leonidas I.
in utero	in the womb	
in utrumque paratus	prepared for either (event)	
in vacuo	in a void	In a vacuum; isolated from other things.
in varietate concordia	united in diversity	The motto of the European Union
in verbo tuo	at your word	a reference to the response of Peter when he was invited by Jesus to "Put out into the deep and let down your nets for a catch" (Luke 5:4–5).
invidiae prudentia victrix	prudence conquers jealousy	
in vino veritas	in wine [there is] truth	That is, wine loosens the tongue (referring to alcohol's disinhibitory effects).
in vitro	in glass	An experimental or process methodology performed in a "non-natural" setting (e.g. in a laboratory using a glass test tube or Petri dish), and thus outside of a living organism or cell. Alternative experimental or process methodologies include in vitro, ex vivo and in vivo.
in vivo	in life/in a living thing	An experiment or process performed on a living specimen.
in vivo veritas	in a living thing [there is] truth	An expression used by biologists to express the fact that laboratory findings from testing an organism in vitro are not always reflected when applied to an organism in vivo. Pun on in vino veritas.
incepto ne desistam	May I not shrink from my purpose!	Motto of Westville Boys' High School and Westville Girls' High School, from Virgil, Aeneid, Book 1. Used by Juno, queen of heaven, who hated the Trojans led by Aeneas. When she saw the fleet of Aeneas on its way to Italy, after the sack of Troy by the Greeks, she planned to scatter it by means of strong winds. In her determination to accomplish her task she cried out "Incepto ne desistam!"
incertae sedis	of uncertain position (seat)	Term used to classify a taxonomic group when its broader relationships are unknown or undefined.
incredibile dictu	incredible to say	Variant on mirabile dictu.
intus et in cute	inwardly and in the skin	Intimately, without reservation. Persius, Satire 3:30.
Index Librorum Prohibitorum	Index of prohibited (or, forbidden) books	List of books considered heretical by the Roman Catholic Church.
indigens Deo	being in need of God, beggar before God	From Augustine, De Civitate Dei XII, 1.3: beatitudinem consequatur nec expleat indigentiam suam, "since it is not satisfied unless it be perfectly blessed".
indignor quandoque bonus dormitat Homerus	I too am annoyed whenever good Homer falls asleep	Horace, Ars Poetica 358
indivisibiliter ac inseparabiliter	indivisible and inseparable	Motto of Austria-Hungary before it was divided and separated into independent states in 1918.
infinitus est numerus stultorum	unending is the number of fools	
infirma mundi elegit Deus	God chooses the weak of the world	The motto of Venerable Vital-Justin Grandin, the bishop of the St. Albert Diocese, which is now the Roman Catholic Archdiocese of Edmonton
infra dignitatem (infra dig)	beneath (one's) dignity	
ingenio stat sine morte decus	the honors of genius are eternal	Propertius, Elegies Book III, 2
initium sapientiae timor Domini	the fear of the Lord is the beginning of wisdom	Psalm 111:10. Motto of the University of Aberdeen, Scotland.
iniuriae qui addideris contumeliam	you who have added insult to injury	Phaedrus, Fables 5/3:5.
inopiae desunt multa, avaritiae omnia	to poverty many things are lacking; to avarice, everything	Publilius Syrus.
insita hominibus libidine alendi de industria rumores	men have an innate desire to propagate rumors or reports	Titus Livius (XXVII, XXIV); Michel de Montaigne, Essays.
instante mense (inst.)	in the present month	Used in formal correspondence to refer to the current month, sometimes abbreviated as inst; e.g.: "Thank you for your letter of the 17th inst."—ult. mense = last month, prox. mense = next month.
Instrumentum regni	instrument of government	Used to express the exploitation of religion by State or ecclesiastical polity as a means of controlling the masses, or in particular to achieve political and mundane ends.
Instrumentum vocale	instrument with voice	So Varro in his De re rustica (On Agriculture) defines the slave: an instrument (as a simple plow, or etc.) with voice.
intaminatis fulget honoribus	untarnished, she shines with honor	From Horace's Odes (III.2.18). Motto of Wofford College.
integer vitae scelerisque purus	unimpaired by life and clean of wickedness	From Horace's Odes (I.22.1) Used as a funeral hymn.
intelligenti pauca	few words suffice for him who understands	
inter alia (i.a.)	among other things	
inter alios	among other persons	
inter arma enim silent leges	in a time of war, the law falls silent	Said by Cicero in Pro Milone as a protest against unchecked political mobs that had virtually seized control of Rome in the 60s and 50s BC. Famously quoted in the essay Civil Disobedience by Henry David Thoreau as "The clatter of arms drowns out the voice of the law". This phrase has also been jokingly translated as "In a time of arms, the legs are silent."
inter caetera	among other (works)	title of a 1493 papal bull
inter mutanda constantia	steadfast in the midst of change	Motto of Rockwell College in Ireland and Francis Libermann Catholic High School in Ontario, Canada
inter spem et metum	between hope and fear	
inter faeces et urinam nascimur	we are born between feces and urine	Attributed to Saint Augustine.
inter sacrum saxumque	between the sacrifice and the stone	Being in a dilemma. From Plautus, Captivi, listed in Adagia by Erasmus. See also: "between a rock and a hard place", "between the devil and the deep blue sea".
inter vivos	between the living	Describes property transfers between living persons, as opposed to a testamentary transfer upon death such as an inheritance; often relevant to tax laws.
interna praestant	what is inside is better	or, virtue/character above all; see: prestant interna (coronae)
intra muros	within the walls	Not public; source of the word intramural. Can also refer to the portion of a city within the city walls (current or past); for example, Intramuros, Manila.
intra vires	within the powers	Within one's authority. Contrasted with ultra vires.
invenias etiam disiecti membra poetae	you would still recognize the scattered fragments of a poet	Horace, Satires, I, 4, 62, in reference to the earlier Roman poet Ennius.
inveniet quod quisque velit	each shall find what he desires	Attributed to Petronius or Prudentius. Motto of the journal Nature in Cambridgeshire: Inveniet quod quisque velit; non omnibus unum est, quod placet; hic spinas colligit, ille rosas ("Each shall find what he desires; no one thing pleases all; one gathers thorns, another roses").
invicta	unconquered	Motto of the English county of Kent and the city of Porto
invictus maneo	I remain unvanquished	Motto of the Armstrong clan
Iohannes est nomen eius	John is his name	Luke 1:63, referring to John the Baptist. Motto of the coat of arms of Puerto Rico.
ipsa scientia potestas est	knowledge itself is power	Famous phrase written by Sir Francis Bacon in 1597
ipse dixit	he himself said it	Commonly said in Medieval debates and referring to Aristotle. Used in general to emphasize that some assertion comes from some authority, i.e., as an argument from authority, and the term ipse-dixitism has come to mean any unsupported rhetorical assertion that lacks a logical argument. Literal translation by Cicero (in his De Natura Deorum 1.10) of the Greek αὐτὸς ἔφα, an invocation by Pythagoreans when appealing to the pronouncements of the master.
ipsissima verba	the very words themselves	"Strictly word for word" (cf. verbatim). Often used in Biblical Studies to describe the record of Jesus' teaching found in the New Testament (specifically, the four Gospels).
ipsissima voce	in the very voice itself	To approximate the main thrust or message without using the exact words
ipso facto	by the fact itself	By that very fact
ipso iure	by the law itself	Automatically as a consequence of law
ira deorum	wrath of the gods	Like the vast majority of inhabitants of the ancient world, the ancient Romans practiced pagan rituals, believing it important to achieve a state of pax deorum (peace of the gods) instead of ira deorum (wrath of the gods): earthquakes, floods, famine, etc.
ira furor brevis est	wrath (anger) is but a brief madness	
ita vero	thus indeed	Useful phrase, as the Romans had no word for "yes", preferring to respond to questions with the affirmative or negative of the question (e.g., "Are you hungry?" was answered by "I am hungry" or "I am not hungry", not "yes" or "no").
ite, missa est	go, it is the dismissal	Loosely: "You have been dismissed". Concluding words addressed to the people in the Mass of the Roman Rite. The term missa "Mass" derives from a reanalysis of the phrase to mean "Go, the missa is accomplished."
iter legis	the path of the law	The path a law takes from its conception to its implementation
iucunda memoria est praeteritorum malorum	pleasant is the memory of past troubles	Cicero, De finibus bonorum et malorum 2, 32, 105
iugulare mortuos	to cut the throat of corpses	From Gerhard Gerhards' (1466–1536) (better known as Erasmus) collection of annotated Adagia (1508). It can mean attacking the work or personality of deceased person. Alternatively, it can be used to describe criticism of an individual already heavily criticised by others.
iuncta iuvant	together they strive	also spelled juncta juvant; from the legal principle quae non valeant singula, iuncta iuvant ("What is without value on its own, helps when joined")
iura novit curia	the court knows the law	Legal principle in civil law countries of the Roman-German tradition that says that lawyers need not argue the law, as that is the office of the court. Sometimes miswritten as iura novat curia (the court renews the laws).
iure matris	in right of his mother	Indicates a right exercised by a son on behalf of his mother
iure uxoris	in right of his wife	Indicates a right exercised by a husband on behalf of his wife
iuris ignorantia est cum ius nostrum ignoramus	it is ignorance of the law when we do not know our own rights	
ius accrescendi	right of accrual	Commonly referred to as "right of survivorship": a rule in property law that surviving joint tenants have rights in equal shares to a decedent's property
ius ad bellum	law towards war	Refers to the laws that regulate the reasons for going to war. Typically, this would address issues of self-defense or preemptive strikes.
ius cogens	compelling law	A peremptory norm, a fundamental principle of international law considered to have acceptance among the international community of states as a whole and from which no derogation is permitted.
ius est ars boni et aequi	the law is the art of goodness and equity	Appears on the front of the Sievekingplatz 2, a courthouse of the Hanseatisches Oberlandesgericht, in Hamburg, Germany.
ius in bello	law in war	Refers to the "laws" that regulate the conduct of combatants during a conflict. Typically, this would address issues of who or what is a valid target, how to treat prisoners, and what sorts of weapons can be used. The word jus is also commonly spelled ius.
ius primae noctis	law of the first night	The droit du seigneur, supposed right of a lord to have sexual relations with a newly married female subject
jus sanguinis	right of blood	A legal doctrine granting citizenship based on the nationality of one's parents
jus soli	right of the soil	A legal doctrine granting birthright citizenship
iustam causam deus non derelinqvet	god will not abandon the just cause	Appears on Francis II Rákóczi's flag.
iustitia dilata est iustitia negata	justice delayed is justice denied	
iustitia fundamentum regni	justice is the foundation of a reign	Motto of the Supreme Public Prosecutor's Office of the Czech Republic.
iustitia nemini neganda est	justice is to be denied to nobody	
iustitia non est neganda, non differenda	justice is not to be denied, not to be delayed	
iustitia omnibus	justice for all	The motto of Washington, D.C.
iuventuti nil arduum	to the young nothing is difficult	Motto of Canberra Girls Grammar School
iuventutis veho fortunas	I bear the fortunes of youth	Motto of Dollar Academy

== L ==
Latin	Translation	Notes
labor ipse voluptas	The pleasure is in the work itself.	Motto of Peter King, 1st Baron King as mentioned within 'The Improvement of the Mind. To Which is Added, a discourse on the Education of Children and Youth' by Isaac Watts 1741.
labor omnia vincit	Hard work conquers all.	Popular as a motto; derived from a phrase in Virgil's Eclogue (X.69: omnia vincit Amor – "Love conquers all"); a similar phrase also occurs in his Georgics I.145.
laborare pugnare parati sumus	To work, (or) to fight; we are ready	Motto of the Cal Poly Maritime Academy
labore et honore	By labour and honour	
laboremus pro patria	Let us work for the fatherland	Motto of the Carlsberg breweries
laboris gloria Ludi	Games are the glory of work,	Motto of the Camborne School of Mines, Cornwall, UK
lacrimae rerum	The tears of things	Virgil, Aeneid 1:462
lapsus	lapse, slip, error; involuntary mistake made while writing or speaking	
lapsus calami	inadvertent typographical error, slip of the pen	
lapsus linguae	inadvertent speech error, slip of the tongue	
lapsus memoriae	slip of memory	source of the term memory lapse
latius est impunitum relinqui facinus nocentis (quam innocentem damnari) (Note: Likely a transcription error from satius est)	It is better to let the crime of the guilty go unpunished (than to condemn the innocent)	
lauda finem	praise to the end	Motto of Nottingham High School
laudatio ejus manet in secula seculorum	His Praise Remains unto Ages of Ages	Motto of Galway
laudator temporis acti	praiser of time past	One who is discontent with the present and instead prefers things of the past ("the good old days"). In Horace's Ars Poetica, line 173; motto of HMS Veteran
laudetur Jesus Christus	Praise (Be) Jesus Christ	Often used as a salutation, but also used after prayers or the reading of the gospel
laus Deo	praise be to God	Inscription on the east side at the peak of the Washington Monument in Washington, D.C.; motto of the Viscount of Arbuthnott and Sydney Grammar School; title of a poem by John Greenleaf Whittier commemorating the passage of the 13th Amendment
lectio brevior potior	The shorter reading is the better	A maxim in text criticism. Codified, but simultaneously refuted, by Johann Jakob Griesbach.
lectio difficilior potior	The more difficult reading is the stronger	
lectori salutem (L. S.)	greetings to the reader	Often abbreviated to L.S., used as opening words for a letter
lege artis	according to the law of the art	Denotes that a certain intervention is performed in a correct way. Used especially in a medical context. The 'art' referred to in the phrase is medicine.
legem terrae	the law of the land	
leges humanae nascuntur, vivunt, et moriuntur	laws of man are born, live and die	
leges sine moribus vanae	laws without morals [are] vain	From Horace's Odes; motto of the University of Pennsylvania
legio patria nostra	The Legion is our fatherland	Motto of the French Foreign Legion
legi, intellexi, et condemnavi	I read, understood, and condemned.	
legis plenitudo charitas	charity (love) is the fulfilment of the law	Motto of Ratcliffe College, UK and of the Rosmini College, NZ
legitime	lawfully	In Roman and civil law, a forced share in an estate; the portion of the decedent's estate from which the immediate family cannot be disinherited. From the French héritier legitime (rightful heir).
levavi occlos	I will lift my eyes	Motto of Hollins University and Keswick School, derived from Psalm 121 (Levavi oculos meos in montes)
lex artis	law of the skill	The rules that regulate a professional duty
lex dei vitae lampas	the law of God is the lamp of life	Motto of the Presbyterian Ladies' College, Melbourne
lex dilationes abhorret	The law abhors delay	alternatively, lex dilationes semper abhorret
lex est quodcumque notamus	the law is whatever we write down	Motto of the Chamber of Notaries of Paris. Also lex est quod notamus.
lex ferenda	the law that should be borne	The law as it ought to be
lex hac edictalilex hac edictali	the law here proclaims	The rule whereby a spouse cannot by deed inter vivos or bequeath by testament to his or her second spouse more than the amount of the smallest portion given or bequeathed to any child.
lex in casulex in casu	law in the event	A law that only concerns one particular case; see law of the case
lex lata	the law that has been borne	The law as it is
lex loci	law of the place	Determination in the choice of law
lex non cogit ad impossibilia	the law does not compel the impossible	alternatively impotentia excusat legam, impossibilium nulla obligatio est
lex non scripta	law that has not been written	Unwritten law, or common law
lex orandi, lex credendi	the law of prayer is the law of faith	
lex paciferat	the law shall bring peace	Motto of the European Gendarmerie Force
lex parsimoniae	law of succinctness	also known as Occam's razor
lex rex	the law [is] king	A principle of government advocating a rule by law rather than by men. The phrase originated as a double entendre in the title of Samuel Rutherford's controversial book Lex, Rex (1644), which espoused a theory of limited government and constitutionalism.
lex scripta	written law	Statutory law; contrasted with lex non scripta
lex talionis	the law of retaliation	Retributive justice (i.e., eye for an eye)
Libertas Justitia Veritas	Liberty Justice Truth	Motto of the Korea University and Free University of Berlin
Libertas perfundet omnia luce	Freedom will flood all things with light	Motto of the University of Barcelona and the Complutense University of Madrid
Libertas quae sera tamen	freedom which [is] however late	Liberty even when it comes late; motto of Minas Gerais, Brazil
Libertas Securitas Justitia	Liberty Security Justice	Motto of the Frontex
libra (lb)	balance; scales	Its abbreviation lb is used as a unit of weight, the pound.
lignum crucis arbor scientiae	The wood of the cross is the tree of knowledge	School motto of Denstone College
lingua franca	Language of the Franks	Often used to describe a common language adopted by people who have different native languages
littera scripta manet	The written word endures	Attributed to Horace. Motto of the National Archives and Records Administration.
loco citato (lc)	in the place cited	More fully written in loco citato; see also opere citato
locum tenens	place holder	A worker who temporarily takes the place of another with similar qualifications, for example as a doctor or a member of the clergy; usually shortened to locum.
locus classicus	a classic place	The most typical or classic case of something; quotation which most typifies its use.
locus minoris resistentiae	place of less resistance	A medical term to describe a location on or in a body that offers little resistance to infection, damage, or injury. For example, a weakened place that tends to be reinjured.
locus poenitentiae	a place of repentance	A legal term, it is the opportunity of withdrawing from a projected contract, before the parties are finally bound; or of abandoning the intention of committing a crime, before it has been completed.
locus sigili (l.s.)	place of the seal	the area on a contract where the seal is to be affixed
locus standi	A right to stand	Standing in law (the right to have one's case in court)
longissimus dies cito conditur	even the longest day soon ends	Pliny the Younger, Epistulae 9/36:4
lorem ipsum		A garbled version of a passage from Cicero's De finibus bonorum et malorum, widely used as a sample text for greeking (laying out text in printing before the final text is available). The original passage reads ...neque porro quisquam est, qui dolorem ipsum, quia dolor sit amet consectetur adipisci velit... ("...nor again is there anyone who loves or pursues or desires to obtain pain of itself, because it is pain...").
luce veritatis	By the light of truth	School motto of Queen Margaret College
luceat lux vestra	Let your light shine	From Matthew Ch. 5 V. 16; popular as a school motto
lucem sequimur	We follow the light	Motto of the University of Exeter
luceo non uro	I shine, not burn	Motto of the Highland Scots Clan Mackenzie
lucida sidera	The shining stars	Horace, Carmina 1/3:2
luctor et emergo	I struggle and emerge	Motto of the Dutch province of Zeeland to denote its battle against the sea, and the Athol Murray College of Notre Dame
Luctor, non mergor	I struggle, but am not overwhelmed	Motto of the Glass Family (Sauchie, Scotland)
lucus a non lucendo	[it is named] a "grove" because it is not lit	From late 4th-century grammarian Honoratus Maurus, who sought to mock implausible word origins such as those proposed by Priscian. It is a jesting suggestion that since the word lucus (dark grove) has a similar appearance to the verb lucere (to shine), the former word is derived from the latter word because of a lack of light in wooded groves. Often used as an example of absurd etymology, it derives from parum luceat (it does not shine [being darkened by shade]) by Quintilian in Institutio Oratoria.
ludemus bene in compania	We play well in groups	Motto of the Barony of Marinus
lupus est homo homini	A man to a man is a wolf	Plautus' adaptation of an old Roman proverb: homo homini lupus est ("man is a wolf to [his fellow] man"). In Asinaria, act II, scene IV, verse 89 [495 overall]. Lupus est homo homini, non homo, quom qualis sit non novit ("a man to a man is a wolf, not a man, when the other doesn't know of what character he is.")
lupus in fabula	the wolf in the story	With the meaning "speak of the wolf, and he will come"; from Terence's play Adelphoe.
lupus non mordet lupum	a wolf does not bite a wolf	
lupus non timet canem latrantem	a wolf is not afraid of a barking dog	
lux aeterna	eternal light	epitaph
lux et lex	light and law	Motto of the Franklin & Marshall College and the University of North Dakota
lux et veritas	light and truth	A translation of the Hebrew Urim and Thummim. Motto of several institutions, including Yale University.
lux ex tenebris	light from darkness	Motto of the 67th Network Warfare Wing
lux hominum vita	light the life of man	Motto of the University of New Mexico
lux in Domino	light in the Lord	Motto of the Ateneo de Manila University
lux in tenebris lucet	The light that shines in the darkness	Motto of Columbia University School of General Studies Also: John 1:5.
lux libertas	light and liberty	Motto of the University of North Carolina at Chapel Hill
Lux mentis Lux orbis	Light of the mind, Light of the world	Motto of Sonoma State University
lux sit	let there be light	A more literal Latinization of the phrase; the most common translation is fiat lux, from Latin Vulgate Bible phrase chosen for the Genesis line "וַיֹּאמֶר אֱלֹהִים, יְהִי אוֹר; וַיְהִי-אוֹר" (And God said: 'Let there be light.' And there was light). Motto of the University of Washington.
lux tua nos ducat	Your light guides us	
lux, veritas, virtus	light, truth, courage	Motto of Northeastern University
lux, vita, caritas	light, life, love	Motto of St John's College, Johannesburg

== M ==
Latin	Translation	Notes
Macte animo! Generose puer sic itur ad astra	Young, cheer up! This is the way to the skies.	Motto of Academia da Força Aérea (Air Force Academy) of the Brazilian Air Force
macte virtute sic itur ad astra	those who excel, thus reach the stars	or "excellence is the way to the stars"; frequent motto; from Virgil's Aeneid IX.641 (English, Dryden)
magister dixit	the teacher has said it	Canonical medieval reference to Aristotle, precluding further discussion
magister meus Christus	Christ is my teacher	common Catholic edict and motto of a Catholic private school, Andrean High School in Merrillville, Indiana
Magna Carta	Great Charter	Set of documents from 1215 between Pope Innocent III, King John of England, and English barons.
magna cum laude	with great praise	Common Latin honor, above cum laude and below summa cum laude
magna di curant, parva neglegunt	The gods care about great matters, but they neglect small ones	Cicero, De Natura Deorum 2:167
magna est vis consuetudinis	great is the power of habit	
Magna Europa est patria nostra	Greater Europe is Our Fatherland	Political motto of pan-Europeanists
magno cum gaudio	with great joy	
magnum opus	great work	Said of someone's masterpiece
magnum vectigal est parsimonia	Economy is a great revenue	Cicero, Paradoxa 6/3:49. Sometimes translated into English as "thrift (or frugality) is a great revenue (or income)", edited from its original subordinate clause: "O di immortales! non intellegunt homines, quam magnum vectigal sit parsimonia." (English: O immortal gods! Men do not understand what a great revenue is thrift.)
maior e longinquo reverentia	greater reverence from afar	When viewed from a distance, everything is beautiful. Tacitus, Annales 1.47
maior singulis minor universis		(the prince, king, pope) is more than the individual, but less than their totality
maiora premunt	greater things are pressing	Used to indicate that it is the moment to address more important, urgent, issues.
mala fide	in bad faith	Said of an act done with knowledge of its illegality, or with intention to defraud or mislead someone. Opposite of bona fide.
mala ipsa nova	Bad News Itself	Motto of the inactive 495th Fighter Squadron, US Air Force
mala tempora currunt	bad times are upon us	Also used ironically, e.g.: New teachers know all tricks used by pupils to copy from classmates? Oh, mala tempora currunt!.
male captus bene detentus	wrongly captured, properly detained	An illegal arrest will not prejudice the subsequent detention/trial.
malo mori quam foedari	Death rather than dishonour	Motto of the inactive 34th Battalion (Australia), the Drimnagh Castle Secondary School
Malo periculosam libertatem quam quietam servitutem	I prefer dangerous liberty to peaceful slavery	Attributed to the Count Palatine of Posen before the Polish Diet, cited in The Social Contract by Jean-Jacques Rousseau
malum discordiae	apple of discord	Alludes to the apple of Eris in the Judgement of Paris, the mythological cause of the Trojan War.
malum in se	wrong in itself	A legal term meaning that something is prohibited because it is inherently wrong (cf. malum prohibitum); for example, murder.
malum prohibitum	wrong due to being prohibited	A legal term meaning that something is only wrong because it is against the law (cf. malum in se); for example, violating a speed limit.
mandamus	we command	A judicial remedy ordering a lower court, government entity, or public authority to do something (or refrain from doing something) as required by law.
malum quo communius eo peius	the more common an evil is, the worse it is	
manibus date lilia plenis	give lilies with full hands	A phrase from Virgil's Aeneid, VI.883, mourning the death of Marcellus, Augustus' nephew. Quoted by Dante as he leaves Virgil in Purgatory, XXX.21, echoed by Walt Whitman in Leaves of Grass III, 6.
manu forte	literally translated means 'with a strong hand', often quoted as 'by strength of hand'	Motto of the Clan McKay
manu militari	with a military hand	Using armed forces in order to achieve a goal
manu propria (m.p.)	with one's own hand	With the implication of "signed by one's hand". Its abbreviated form is sometimes used at the end of typewritten or printed documents or official notices, directly following the name of the person(s) who "signed" the document exactly in those cases where there isn't an actual handwritten signature.
manus manum lavat	one hand washes the other	famous quote from The Pumpkinification of Claudius, ascribed to Seneca the Younger. It implies that one situation helps the other.
manus multae cor unum	many hands, one heart	Motto of the Alpha Delta Phi fraternity.
manus nigra	black hand	
marcet sine adversario virtus	valor becomes feeble without an opponent	Seneca the Younger, De Providentia 2:4. Also, translated into English as "[their] strength and courage droop without an antagonist" ("Of Providence" (1900) by Seneca, translated by Aubrey Stewart), "without an adversary, prowess shrivels" (Moral Essays (1928) by Seneca, translated by John W, Basore) and "prowess withers without opposition".
mare clausum	closed sea	In law, a sea under the jurisdiction of one nation and closed to all others.
Mare Ditat, Rosa Decorat	The sea enriches, the rose adorns	Motto of Montrose, Angus and HMS Montrose
mare liberum	free sea	In law, a sea open to international shipping navigation.
mare nostrum	our sea	A nickname given to the Mediterranean during the height of the Roman Empire, as it encompassed the entire coastal basin.
Mater Dei	Mother of God	A name given to describe Mary, who gave birth to Jesus, who is also called the Son of God.
mater familias	the mother of the family	The female head of a family. See pater familias.
mater lectionis	mother of reading	a consonant used to represent a vowel in writing systems that lack separate vowel characters, such as Hebrew and Arabic script. Translation of Hebrew: אֵם קְרִיאָה ʾem kəriʾa.
Mater semper certa est	the mother is always certain	A Roman law principle that the mother of a child is always known, as opposed to the father who may not be known. This principle had the power of praesumptio iuris et de iure (literally "presumption of law and by law"), meaning that no counter-evidence can be made against this principle.
materia medica	medical matter	Branch of medical science concerned with the study of drugs used in the treatment of disease. Also, the drugs themselves.
maxima debetur puero reverentia	greatest deference is owed to the child	from Juvenal's Satires XIV:47
me vexat pede	it annoys me at the foot	Less literally, "my foot itches". Refers to a trivial situation or person that is being a bother, possibly in the sense of wishing to kick that thing away or, such as the commonly used expressions, a "pebble in one's shoe" or "nipping at one's heels".
mea culpa	through my fault	Used in Christian prayers and confession to denote the inherently flawed nature of mankind; can also be extended to mea maxima culpa (through my greatest fault).
mea navis aëricumbens anguillis abundat	My hovercraft is full of eels	A relatively common recent Latinization inspired by the Dirty Hungarian Phrasebook sketch by Monty Python.
media vita in morte sumus	In the midst of our lives we die	A well-known sequence, falsely attributed to Notker during the Middle Ages. It was translated by Cranmer and became a part of the burial service in the funeral rites of the Anglican Book of Common Prayer.
Mediolanum captum est	Milan has been captured	Used erroneously as Mediolanum Capta Est by the black metal band Mayhem as an album title. Mediolanum was an ancient city in present-day Milan, Italy.
melius abundare quam deficere	Better too much than not enough	Also used in elliptical form as melius abundare.
meliora	better things	Carrying the connotation of "always better". Motto of the University of Rochester.
meliorare legem meliorare vitam est	To improve the law is to improve life.	Motto of the Salem/Roanoke County, Virginia Bar Association.
meliorem lapsa locavit	He has planted one better than the one fallen.	Motto of the Belmont County, Ohio, and the motto in the seal of the Northwest Territory
mendacem oportet esse memorem	a liar ought to have a good memory	From Quintilian, Institutio Oratoria, book IV, ch. 2, line 91.
memento mori	remember that [you will] die	remember your mortality; medieval Latin based on "memento moriendum esse" in antiquity.
memento vivere	remember to live	
meminerunt omnia amantes	lovers remember all	
memores acti prudentes futuri	mindful of things done, aware of things to come	Thus, both remembering the past and foreseeing the future. From the North Hertfordshire District Council coat of arms.
Memoriae Sacrum (M.S.)	Sacred to the memory (of ...)	A common first line on 17th-century English church monuments. The Latinized name of the deceased follows, in the genitive case. Alternatively it may be used as a heading, the inscription following being in English, for example: "Memoriae Sacrum. Here lies the body of ..."
mens agitat molem	the mind moves the mass	From Virgil; motto of several educational institutions
Mens conscia recti	a mind aware of what is right	Motto of The College Preparatory School in Oakland, California
mens et manus	mind and hand	Motto of Massachusetts Institute of Technology, New York Institute of Technology, and also of the Philadelphia College of Osteopathic Medicine.
mens rea	guilty mind	Also "culprit mind". A term used in discussing the mindset of an accused criminal.
mens sana in corpore sano	a healthy mind in a healthy body	Satire X of the Roman poet Juvenal (10.356); motto of many sporting clubs, military and educational institutions
mente et artificio	with mind and skill	Motto of Toronto Metropolitan University, Canada
metri causa	for the sake of the metre	Excusing flaws in poetry "for the sake of the metre"
Miles Gloriosus	Glorious Soldier	Or "Boastful Soldier". Miles Gloriosus is the title of a play of Plautus. A stock character in comedy, the braggart soldier. (It is said that at Salamanca, there is a wall, on which graduates inscribe their names, where Francisco Franco had a plaque installed reading "Franciscus Francus Miles Gloriosus".)
miles praesidii libertatis	Soldier of the Bastion of Freedom	A phrase on the plaque in commemoration of Prof. Benjamin Marius Telders, Academiegebouw Leiden (Netherlands).
mictus cruentus	bloody urine	see hematuria
minatur innocentibus qui parcit nocentibus	he threatens the innocent who spares the guilty	
minus malum toleratur ut maius tollat	choose the lesser evil so a greater evil may be averted; the lesser of two evils principle	
mirabile dictu	wonderful to tell	Virgil
mirabile visu	wonderful to see	A Roman phrase used to describe a wonderful event/happening.
mirum videtur quod sit factum iam diu	Does it seem wonderful [merely] because it was done a long time/so long ago?	Livius Andronicus, Aiax Mastigophorus.
miscerique probat populos et foedera jungi	He approves of the mingling of the peoples and their bonds of union	Latin Aeneid of Virgil, Book IV, line 112, "he" referring to the great Roman god, who approved of the settlement of Romans in Africa. Old Motto of Trinidad and Tobago, and used in the novel A Bend in the River by V. S. Naipaul.
misera est servitus ubi jus est aut incognitum aut vagum	miserable is that state of slavery in which the law is unknown or uncertain	Quoted by Samuel Johnson in his paper for James Boswell on Vicious intromission.
miserabile visu	terrible to see	A terrible happening or event.
miseram pacem vel bello bene mutari	A bad peace is even worse than war.	From Tacitus' Annales, III, 44.
miserere nobis	have mercy upon us	A phrase within the Gloria in Excelsis Deo and the Agnus Dei, to be used at certain points in Christian religious ceremonies.
Missio Dei	the Mission of God	A theological phrase in the Christian religion.
missit me Dominus	the Lord has sent me	A phrase used by Jesus.
mittimus	we send	A warrant of commitment to prison, or an instruction for a jailer to hold someone in prison.
mobilis in mobili	"moving in a moving thing" or, poetically, "changing through the changing medium"	The motto of the Nautilus from the 1870 Jules Verne novel Twenty Thousand Leagues Under the Seas.
modus operandi (M.O.)	method of operating	Usually used to describe a criminal's methods.
modus ponens	method of placing	Loosely "method of affirming", a logical rule of inference stating that from propositions if P then Q and P, then one can conclude Q.
modus tollens	method of removing	Loosely "method of denying", a logical rule of inference stating that from propositions if P then Q and not Q, then one can conclude not P.
modus vivendi	method of living or way of life	An accommodation between disagreeing parties to allow life to go on. A practical compromise.
Monasterium sine libris est sicut civitas sine opibus	A monastery without books is like a city without wealth	Used in the Umberto Eco novel The Name of the Rose. Part of a much larger phrase: Monasterium sine libris, est sicut civitas sine opibus, castrum sine numeris, coquina sine suppellectili, mensa sine cibis, hortus sine herbis, pratum sine floribus, arbor sine foliis. Translation: A monastery without books is like a city without wealth, a fortress without soldiers, a kitchen without utensils, a table without food, a garden without plants, a meadow without flowers, a tree without leaves.
montani semper liberi	mountaineers [are] always free	State motto of West Virginia, adopted in 1872; part of the coat of arms for the Colombian city of Bucaramanga.
Montis Insignia Calpe	Badge of the Mons Calpe (Rock of Gibraltar)	A self-referential literal identifier below the emblem
morbus virgineus	Disease of the virgins or Virgin's disease	Hypochromic anemia, an iron deficiency anemia common in young women
more ferarum	like beasts	used to describe any sexual act in the manner of beasts
more suo	in his/her/its/their usual way	
morior invictus	I die unvanquished	sometimes also translated as "death before defeat"
morituri nolumus mori	we who are about to die don't want to	From Terry Pratchett's 2001 novel The Last Hero, a parody on morituri te salutant/salutamus
morituri te salutant	those who are about to die salute you	Used once in Suetonius' De Vita Caesarum 5, (Divus Claudius), chapter 21, by the condemned prisoners manning galleys about to take part in a mock naval battle on Lake Fucinus in AD 52. Popular misconception ascribes it as a gladiator's salute. See also: Ave Imperator, morituri te salutant and Naumachia.
mors certa, hora incerta	death is certain, its hour is uncertain	
mors mihi lucrum	death to me is reward	A common epitaph, from St Paul's Epistle to the Philippians, 1:21 (Mihi enim vivere Christus est et mori lucrum, translated in the King James Bible as: "For to me to live is Christ and to die is gain")
mors omnibus	death to all	Signifies anger and depression.
mors tua vita mea	your death, my life	From medieval Latin, it indicates that battle for survival, where your defeat is necessary for my victory, survival.
mors vincit omnia	"death conquers all" or "death always wins"	An axiom often found on headstones; cf. amor vincit omnia
morte magis metuenda senectus	old age should rather be feared than death	from Juvenal in his Satires
mortui vivos docent	The dead teach the living	Used to justify dissections of human cadavers in order to understand the cause of death.
mortuum flagellas	you are flogging a dead (man)	From Gerhard Gerhards' (1466–1536) [better known as Erasmus] collection of annotated Adagia (1508). Criticising one who will not be affected in any way by the criticism.
mos maiorum	the custom of our ancestors	an unwritten code of laws and conduct, of the Romans. It institutionalized cultural traditions, societal mores, and general policies, as distinct from written laws.
motu proprio	on his own initiative	Or "by his own accord." Identifies a class of papal documents, administrative papal bulls.
mulgere hircum	to milk a male goat	From Gerhard Gerhards' (1466–1536) [better known as Erasmus] collection of annotated Adagia (1508). Attempting the impossible.
mulier est hominis confusio	woman is man's ruin	"Part of a comic definition of woman" from the Altercatio Hadriani Augusti et Secundi. Famously quoted by Chauntecleer in Geoffrey Chaucer's Canterbury Tales.
multa paucis	Say much in few words	
multis e gentibus vires	from many peoples, strength	Motto of Saskatchewan
multitudo sapientium sanitas orbis	a multitude of the wise is the health of the world	From the Vulgate, Wisdom of Solomon 6:24. Motto of the University of Victoria.
multum in parvo	much in little	Conciseness. The term "mipmap" is formed using the phrase's abbreviation "MIP"; motto of Rutland, a county in central England. Latin phrases are often multum in parvo, conveying much in few words.
mundus senescit	the world grows old	
mundus vult decipi	the world wants to be deceived	Ascribed to Roman satirist Petronius. Also in Augustine of Hippo's De Civitate Dei contra Paganos (5th century AD), Sebastian Franck's Paradoxa Ducenta Octoginta (1542), and in James Branch Cabell's 1921 novel Figures of Earth.
mundus vult decipi, ergo decipiatur	the world wants to be deceived, so let it be deceived	Ascribed to Roman satirist Petronius. Also in Augustine of Hippo's De Civitate Dei contra Paganos (5th century AD) as "si mundus vult decipi, decipiatur" ("if the world will be gulled, let it be gulled"), and only the first part, "mundus vult decipi" ("the world wants to be deceived"), in Sebastian Franck's Paradoxa Ducenta Octoginta (1542) and in James Branch Cabell's Figures of Earth (1921).
munit haec et altera vincit	this one defends and the other one conquers	Motto of Nova Scotia.
murus aeneus conscientia sana	a wall of brass is a clear conscience	a person with a clear conscience is as strong and impenetrable as a wall made of brass; this phrase is often seen as a family motto, particularly associated with the Earl of Scarbrough and Loder Baronets in England
mutata lex non perit	the law that evolves does not die	Motto of Seneca the Younger
mutatis mutandis	after changing what needed to be changed	"with the appropriate changes"
mutato nomine de te fabula narratur	change but the name, and the story is told of yourself	Horace, Satires, I. 1. 69. Preceded by Quid rides? ("Why do you laugh?"; see Quid rides).

== N ==
Latin	Translation	Notes
nanos gigantum humeris insidentes	Dwarfs standing on the shoulders of giants	First recorded by John of Salisbury in the twelfth century and attributed to Bernard of Chartres. Also commonly known by the letters of Isaac Newton: "If I have seen further it is by standing on the shoulders of giants".
nascentes morimur finisque ab origine pendet	As we are born we die, and our end hangs from our beginning	
nasciturus pro iam nato habetur, quotiens de commodis eius agitur	The unborn is deemed to have been born to the extent that his own inheritance is concerned	Refers to a situation where an unborn child is deemed to be entitled to certain inheritance rights.
natura abhorret a vacuo	nature abhors vacuum	Pseudo-explanation for why a liquid will climb up a tube to fill a vacuum, often given before the discovery of atmospheric pressure.
natura artis magistra	Nature is the teacher of art	Full name of the zoo Artis in the centre of Amsterdam
natura naturans	nature acting	originally linked to Aristotle, then to his Arabic commentators
natura naturantis	nature creating, creative nature	literary motif used by Bolesław Leśmian
natura naturata	nature created	concept explored by Baruch Spinoza
natura nihil frustra facit	nature does nothing in vain	Cf. Aristotle: "οὐθὲν γάρ, ὡς φαμέν, μάτην ἡ φύσις ποιεῖ" (Politics I 2, 1253a9) and Leucippus: "Everything that happens does so for a reason and of necessity."
natura non contristatur	nature is not saddened	That is, the natural world is not sentimental or compassionate. Derived by Arthur Schopenhauer from an earlier source.
natura non facit saltum ita nec lex	nature does not make a leap, thus neither does the law	Shortened form of sicut natura nil facit per saltum ita nec lex (just as nature does nothing by a leap, so neither does the law), referring to both nature and the legal system moving gradually.
natura non facit saltus	nature makes no leaps	A famous aphorism of Carl Linnaeus stating that all organisms bear relationships on all sides, their forms changing gradually from one species to the next. From Philosophia Botanica (1751).
natura valde simplex est et sibi consona	Nature is exceedingly simple and harmonious with itself	Sir Isaac Newton's famous quote, defining foundation of all modern sciences. Can be found in his Unpublished Scientific Papers of Isaac Newton: A selection from the Portsmouth Collection in the University Library, Cambridge, 1978 edition
naturalia non sunt turpia	What is natural is not dirty	Based on Servius' commentary on Virgil's Georgics (3:96): "turpis non est quia per naturam venit."
naturam expellas furca, tamen usque recurret	You may drive out Nature with a pitchfork, yet she still will hurry back	You must take the basic nature of something into account. – Horace, Epistles, Book I, epistle X, line 24.
naturam primum cognoscere rerum	First to learn the nature of things	Motto of the Australian National University
navigare necesse est, vivere non est necesse	to sail is necessary; to live is not necessary	Attributed by Plutarch to Gnaeus Pompeius Magnus, who, during a severe storm, commanded sailors to bring food from Africa to Rome. Translated from Plutarch's Greek "πλεῖν ἀνάγκη, ζῆν οὐκ ἀνάγκη".
ne plus ultra	nothing more beyond	Also nec plus ultra or non plus ultra. A descriptive phrase meaning the most extreme point, or the best form, of something. Most notably the Pillars of Hercules were in the geographic sense the nec plus ultra of the ancient Mediterranean world, before the discovery of the Americas. Holy Roman Emperor Charles V's heraldic emblem contradicted this postulate, using an amended version of the phrase inscribed on two pillars – as plus ultra ("more (lies) beyond"), without the negation, referring to the on-going Spanish colonization of the recently discovered Americas, which lay beyond the Pillars of Hercules. Non plus ultra is the motto of the Spanish exclave of Melilla, situated on a Mediterranean cape 230 km east of the original southern Pillar of Hercules. The Boston Musical Instrument Company engraved ne plus ultra on its instruments from 1869 to 1928 to signify that none were better.
ne puero gladium	do not give a sword to a boy	Never give dangerous tools to someone who is untrained to use them or too immature to understand the damage they can do.
ne supra crepidam sutor iudicaret	a shoemaker should not judge beyond the shoe	see Sutor, ne ultra crepidam
ne te quaesiveris extra	do not seek outside yourself	line from the Roman satirist Persius inscribed on the boulder to the right of Sir John Suckling in the painting of the aforementioned subject by Sir Anthony van Dyck (ca. 1638) and invoked by Ralph Waldo Emerson at the opening of his essay Self-Reliance (1841)
Nec aspera terrent	They are not terrified of the rough things	They are not afraid of difficulties. Less literally "Difficulties be damned." Motto for 27th Infantry Regiment (United States) and the Duke of Lancaster's Regiment. Nec = not; aspera = rough ones/things; terrent = they terrify / do terrify / are terrifying.
Nec deus intersit, nisi dignus vindice nodus (inciderit)	That a god not intervene, unless a knot show up that be worthy of such an untangler	"When the miraculous power of God is necessary, let it be resorted to: when it is not necessary, let the ordinary means be used." From Horace's Ars Poetica as a caution against deus ex machina.
nec dextrorsum, nec sinistrorsum	Neither to the right nor to the left	Do not get distracted. Motto for Bishop Cotton Boys' School and the Bishop Cotton Girls' School, both located in Bangalore, India.
nec spe, nec metu	without hope, without fear	
nec tamen consumebatur	and yet it was not consumed	Refers to the burning bush of Exodus 3:2. Motto of many Presbyterian churches throughout the world.
nec temere, nec timide	neither reckless nor timid	Motto of the Dutch 11th Air Manoeuvre Brigade and the city of Gdańsk, Poland
nec vi, nec clam, nec precario	Without permission, without secrecy, without interruption	The law of adverse possession
nec vir fortis, nec fæmina casta	if the man is not firm, the woman is not chaste	From Jonathan Swift's 1726 satire Gulliver's Travels where it is attributed to Polydore Vergil
neca eos omnes, Deus suos agnoscet	kill them all, God will know his own	alternate rendition of Caedite eos. Novit enim Dominus qui sunt eius. by Arnaud Amalric
necesse est aut imiteris aut oderis	you must either imitate or loathe the world	Seneca the Younger, Epistulae morales ad Lucilium, 7:7
necesse est credere unam tantum esse potentiam absolutam	It is necessary to believe that there is only one absolute power	
necessitas etiam timidos fortes facit	need makes even the timid brave	Sallust, The Conspiracy of Catiline, 58:19
nemine contradicente (nem. con., N.C.D.)	with no one speaking against	Less literally, "without dissent". Used especially in committees, where a matter may be passed nem. con., or unanimously, or with unanimous consent.
nemini parco	I spare no one.	Death reminding mankind we all have the same fate; found in the Middle Ages engraved in death's scythe
nemo contra Deum nisi Deus ipse	No one against God except God himself	From Goethe's autobiography From my Life: Poetry and Truth, p. 598
nemo dat quod non habet	no one gives what he does not have	Thus, "none can pass better title than they have"
nemo est supra legem (or leges)	nobody is above the law (or laws)	
Nemo igitur vir magnus sine aliquo adflatu divino umquam fuit	No great man ever existed who did not enjoy some portion of divine inspiration	From Cicero's De Natura Deorum, book 2, chapter LXVI, 167
nemo iudex in causa sua	no man shall be a judge in his own cause	Legal principle that no individual can preside over a hearing in which he holds a specific interest or bias
nemo malus felix	No one bad (is) happy	Less literally, "peace visits not the guilty mind". Also translated to "no rest for the wicked." Refers to the inherent psychological issues that plague bad/guilty people.
nemo me impune lacessit	No one provokes me with impunity	Motto of the Order of the Thistle, and consequently of Scotland, found stamped on the milled edge of certain British pound sterling coins. It is the motto of the Montressors in the Edgar Allan Poe short story "The Cask of Amontillado". Motto of the San Beda College Beta Sigma Fraternity.
nemo mortalium omnibus horis sapit	No mortal is wise at all times	The wisest may make mistakes.
nemo nisi per amicitiam cognoscitur	No one learns except by friendship	Used to imply that one must like a subject in order to study it.
nemo propheta in patria (sua)	no man is a prophet in his own land	Concept present in all four Gospels (Matthew 13:57; Mark 6:4; Luke 4:24; John 4:44).
nemo saltat sobrius	Nobody dances sober	The short and more common form of Nemo enim fere saltat sobrius, nisi forte insanit, "Nobody dances sober, unless he happens to be insane", a quote from Cicero (from the speech "Pro Murena").
nemo tenetur se ipsum accusare	no one is bound to accuse himself (the right to silence)	A maxim banning mandatory self-incrimination. Near-synonymous with accusare nemo se debet nisi coram Deo. Similar phrases include: nemo tenetur armare adversarium contra se (no one is bound to arm an opponent against himself), meaning that a defendant is not obligated to in any way assist the prosecutor to his own detriment; nemo tenetur edere instrumenta contra se (no one is bound to produce documents against himself, meaning that a defendant is not obligated to provide materials to be used against himself (this is true in Roman law and has survived in modern criminal law, but no longer applies in modern civil law); and nemo tenere prodere se ipsum (no one is bound to betray himself), meaning that a defendant is not obligated to testify against himself.
neque semper arcum tendit Apollo	nor does Apollo always keep his bow drawn	Horace, Carmina 2/10:19-20. The same image appears in a fable of Phaedrus.
Ne quid nimis	Nothing in excess	
nervos belli, pecuniam infinitam	Endless money forms the sinews of war	In war, it is essential to be able to purchase supplies and to pay troops (as Napoleon put it, "An army marches on its stomach").
nihil ad rem	nothing to do with the point	That is, in law, irrelevant and/or inconsequential.
nihil boni sine labore	nothing achieved without hard work	Motto of Palmerston North Boys' High School
nihil dicit	he says nothing	In law, a declination by a defendant to answer charges or put in a plea.
nihil difficile amanti puto	I think that nothing is difficult for a lover.	From Cicero's Orator.
nihil enim lacrima citius arescit	nothing dries sooner than a tear	Pseudo-Cicero, Rhetorica ad Herennium, 2/31:50
nihil humanum mihi alienum	nothing human is alien to me	Adapted from Terence's Heauton Timorumenos (The Self-Tormentor), homo sum humani a me nihil alienum puto ("I am a human being; nothing human is strange to me"). Sometimes ending in est.
nihil in intellectu nisi prius in sensu	nothing in the intellect unless first in sense	The guiding principle of empiricism, and accepted in some form by Aristotle, Aquinas, Locke, Berkeley, and Hume. Leibniz, however, added nisi intellectus ipse (except the intellect itself).
nihil nimis	nothing too	Or nothing to excess. Latin translation of the inscription of the Temple of Apollo at Delphi.
nihil novi	nothing of the new	Or just "nothing new". The phrase exists in two versions: as nihil novi sub sole (nothing new under the sun), from the Vulgate, and as nihil novi nisi commune consensu (nothing new unless by the common consensus), a 1505 law of the Polish–Lithuanian Commonwealth and one of the cornerstones of its Golden Liberty.
nihil obstat	nothing prevents	A notation, usually on a title page, indicating that a Roman Catholic censor has reviewed the book and found nothing objectionable to faith or morals in its content. See also imprimatur.
nihil sine Deo	nothing without God	Motto of the Kingdom of Romania, while ruled by the Hohenzollern-Sigmaringen dynasty (1878–1947).
nihil ultra	nothing beyond	Motto of St. Xavier's College, Calcutta
nil admirari	be surprised at nothing	Or "nihil admirari". Cicero, Tusculanae Disputationes (3,30), Horace, Epistulae (1,6,1), and Seneca, Epistulae morales ad Lucilium, (8,5). Motto of the Fitzgibbon family. See John FitzGibbon, 1st Earl of Clare
nil desperandum	nothing must be despaired at	"never despair"
nil igitur fieri de nilo posse fatendumst	nothing, therefore, we must confess, can be made from nothing	From Lucretius' De rerum natura (On the Nature of Things), I.205
nil igitur mors est ad nos	Death, therefore, is nothing to us	From Lucretius' De rerum natura (On the Nature of Things), III.831
nil mortalibus ardui est	nothing is impossible for humankind	From Horace's Odes. Motto of Rathkeale College, New Zealand and Brunts School, England.
nil nisi bonum	(about the dead say) nothing unless (it is) good	Short for nil nisi bonum de mortuis dicere. That is, "Don't speak ill of anyone who has died". Also Nil magnum nisi bonum (nothing is great unless good), motto of St Catherine's School, Toorak, Pennant Hills High School and Petit Seminaire Higher Secondary School.
nil nisi malis terrori	no terror, except to the bad	Motto of The King's School, Macclesfield
nil per os, rarely non per os (n.p.o.)	nothing through the mouth	Medical shorthand indicating that oral foods and fluids should be withheld from the patient.
nil satis nisi optimum	nothing [is] enough unless [it is] the best	Motto of Everton F.C., Liverpool, and several other organisations
nil sine labore	nothing without labour	Motto of many schools
nil sine numine	nothing without the divine will	Or "nothing without providence". State motto of Colorado, adopted in 1861. Probably derived from Virgil's Aeneid, book 2, line 777, non haec sine numine divum eveniunt (these things do not come to pass without the will of Heaven). See also numen.
nil volentibus arduum	Nothing [is] arduous for the willing	Nothing is impossible for the willing
nisi	unless	A decree nisi is a court order (often for divorce) that will come into force on a certain date "unless" cause is shown why it should not.
nisi Dominus frustra	if not the Lord, [it is] in vain	That is, "everything is in vain without God". Summarized from Psalm 127 (126 Vulgate), nisi Dominus aedificaverit domum in vanum laboraverunt qui aedificant eam nisi Dominus custodierit civitatem frustra vigilavit qui custodit (unless the Lord builds the house, they work on a useless thing who build it; unless the Lord guards the community, he keeps watch in vain who guards it); widely used motto.
nisi paria non pugnant	Unless there are a pair, they do not fight.	Less literally, "it takes two to make a fight". Irascetur aliquis: tu contra beneficiis prouoca; cadit statim simultas ab altera parte deserta; nisi paria non pugnant. (If any one is angry with you, meet his anger by returning benefits for it: a quarrel which is only taken up on one side falls to the ground: it takes two men to fight.) Seneca the Younger, De Ira (On Anger): Book 2, cap. 34, line 5.
nisi prius	unless previously	In England, a direction that a case be brought up to Westminster for trial before a single judge and jury. In the United States, a court where civil actions are tried by a single judge sitting with a jury, as distinguished from an appellate court.
nitimur in vetitum	We strive for the forbidden	From Ovid's Amores, III.4:17. It means that when we are denied of something, we will eagerly pursue the denied thing. Used by Friedrich Nietzsche in his Ecce Homo to indicate that his philosophy pursues what is forbidden to other philosophers.
nobis bene, nemini male	Good for us, Bad for no one	Inscription on the old Nobistor gatepost that divided Altona and St. Pauli
nolens volens	unwilling, willing	That is, "whether unwillingly or willingly". Sometimes rendered volens nolens, aut nolens aut volens or nolentis volentis. Similar to willy-nilly, though that word is derived from Old English will-he nil-he ([whether] he will or [whether] he will not).
noli me tangere	do not touch me	Commonly translated "touch me not". According to the Gospel of John, this was said by Jesus to Mary Magdalene after his resurrection.
Noli turbare circulos meos!	Do not disturb my circles!	That is, "Don't upset my calculations!" Said by Archimedes to a Roman soldier who, despite having been given orders not to, killed Archimedes at the conquest of Syracuse, Sicily.
nolite timere	be not afraid	heraldic motto, from Luke 2:10–12
nolle prosequi	to be unwilling to prosecute	A legal motion by a prosecutor or other plaintiff to drop legal charges, usually in exchange for a diversion program or out-of-court settlement.
nolo contendere	I do not wish to contend	That is, "no contest". A plea that can be entered on behalf of a defendant in a court that states that the accused doesn't admit guilt, but will accept punishment for a crime. Nolo contendere pleas cannot be used as evidence in another trial.
nomen amicitiae sic, quatenus expedit, haeret	the name of friendship lasts just so long as it is profitable	Petronius, Satyricon, 80.
nomen dubium	doubtful name	A scientific name of unknown or doubtful application.
nomen est omen	the name is a sign	Thus, "true to its name".
nomen nescio (N.N.)	I do not know the name	Thus, the name or person in question is unknown.
nomen mysticum	mystic name	secret members' name in some organizations
nomen nudum	naked name	A purported scientific name that does not fulfill the proper formal criteria and therefore cannot be used unless it is subsequently proposed correctly.
non Angli sed angeli, si forent Christiani	They are not Angles, but angels, if they were Christian	A pun, ascribed (in a different wording) by Bede to Pope Gregory I, said to have been uttered by the latter on seeing pale-skinned Angle children at a slave market.
non auro, sed ferro, recuperanda est patria	Not with gold, but with iron must the fatherland be reclaimed	According to some Roman this sentence was said by Marcus Furius Camillus to Brennus, the chief of the Gauls, after he demanded more gold from the citizens of the recently sacked Rome in 390 BC.
non bene pro toto libertas venditur auro	liberty is not well sold for all the gold	Motto of Republic of Ragusa, inscribed over the gates of St. Lawrence Fortress. From Gualterus Anglicus's version of Aesop's fable "The Dog and the Wolf".
non bis in idem	not twice in the same thing	A legal principle forbidding double jeopardy.
non canimus surdis, respondent omnia silvae	we sing not to the deaf; the trees echo every word	Virgil, Eclogues 10:8
non causa pro causa	not the cause for the cause	Also known as the "questionable cause" or "false cause". Refers to any logical fallacy where a cause is incorrectly identified.
non compos mentis	not in control of the mind	See compos mentis. Also rendered non compos sui (not in control of himself). Samuel Johnson theorized that the word nincompoop may derive from this phrase.
non constat	it is not certain	Used to explain scientific phenomena and religious advocations, for example in medieval history, for rulers to issue a 'Non Constat' decree, banning the worship of a holy figure. In legal context, occasionally a backing for nulling information that was presented by an attorney. Without any tangible proof, Non constat information is difficult to argue for.
non ducor, duco	I am not led; I lead	Motto of São Paulo city, Brazil. See also pro Brasilia fiant eximia.
non est factum	it is not [my] deed	a doctrine in contract law that allows a signing party to escape performance of the agreement. A claim of "non est factum" means that the signature on the contract was signed by mistake, without knowledge of its meaning, but was not done so negligently. A successful plea would make the contract void ab initio.
non est princeps super leges, sed leges supra principem	the prince is not above the laws, but the law is above the prince.	Pliny the Younger, Panegyricus 65:1.
non extinguetur	shall not be extinguished	Motto of the Society of Antiquaries of London accompanying their Lamp of knowledge emblem
non facias malum ut inde fiat bonum	you should not make evil in order that good may be made from it	More simply, "don't do wrong to do right". The direct opposite of the phrase "the ends justify the means".
non hos quaesitum munus in usus	A gift sought for no such purpose	Virgil, Aeneid, 4:647, of the sword with which Dido will commit suicide. "Not for so dire an enterprise design’d." (Dryden trans.; 1697) "A gift asked for no use like this." (Mackail trans.; 1885). "Ne'er given for an end so dire." (Taylor trans.; 1907) "A gift not asked for use like this!" (Williams trans.; 1910). Quoted by Francis Bacon of the civil law, "not made for the countries it governeth".
non impediti ratione cogitationis	unencumbered by the thought process	motto of radio show Car Talk
non in legendo sed in intelligendo leges consistunt	the laws depend not on being read, but on being understood	
non licet omnibus adire Corinthum	not everyone can go to Corinth	The legendary pleasures of Corinth were also quite expensive. Used to refer to anything that not everyone can afford or have the chance to do.
non liquet	it is not proven	Also "it is not clear" or "it is not evident". A sometimes controversial decision handed down by a judge when they feel that the law is not complete.
non loqui sed facere	not talk but action	Motto of the University of Western Australia's Engineering faculty student society.
non mihi solum	not for myself alone	Motto of Anderson Junior College, Singapore.
non ministrari sed ministrare	not to be served, but to serve	Motto of Wellesley College and Shimer College (from Matthew 20:28 in the Vulgate).
non multa sed multum	not quantity but quality	Motto of the Daniel Pearl Magnet High School.
non nisi parendo vincitur	[Nature] cannot be conquered except by being obeyed	From Francis Bacon's Cogitata et visa.
Non nobis Domine	Not to us (oh) Lord	Christian hymn based on Psalm 115.
non nobis nati	'Born not for ourselves'	Motto of St Albans School (Hertfordshire)
non nobis solum	not for ourselves alone	Appears in Cicero's De Officiis Book 1:22 in the form non nobis solum nati sumus (we are not born for ourselves alone). Motto of Lower Canada College, Montreal and University College, Durham University, Willamette University, Gillotts School Henley.
non numerantur, sed ponderantur	they are not counted, but weighed	Old saying. Paul Erdős (1913–1996), in The Man Who Loved Only Numbers by Paul Hoffman
non obstante veredicto	not standing in the way of a verdict	A judgment notwithstanding verdict, a legal motion asking the court to reverse the jury's verdict on the grounds that the jury could not have reached such a verdict reasonably.
non olet	it doesn't smell	See pecunia non olet.
non omnia possumus omnes	not everyone can do everything	Virgil, Eclogues 8:63 (and others).
non omnis moriar	I shall not all die	Horace, Carmina 3/30:6. "Not all of me will die", a phrase expressing the belief that a part of the speaker will survive beyond death.
non plus ultra	nothing further beyond	the ultimate. See also 'ne plus ultra'
non possumus	we cannot	
non possunt primi esse omnes omni in tempore	not everyone can occupy the first rank forever	(It is impossible always to excel) Decimus Laberius.
non progredi est regredi	to not go forward is to go backward	
non prosequitur	he does not proceed	A judgment in favor of a defendant when the plaintiff failed to take the necessary steps in an action within the time allowed.
non qui parum habet, sed qui plus cupit, pauper est	It is not he who has little, but he who wants more, who is the pauper.	Seneca the Younger, Epistulae morales ad Lucilium, 2:6.
non quis sed quid	not who but what	Used in the sense "what matters is not who says it but what he says" – a warning against ad hominem arguments; frequently used as motto, including that of Southwestern University.
non satis scire	to know is not enough	Motto of Hampshire College
non scholae sed vitae	[We learn] not for school but for life	An inversion of non vitae sed scholae now used as a school motto
non sequitur	it does not follow	In general, a comment which is absurd due to not making sense in its context (rather than due to being inherently nonsensical or internally inconsistent), often used in humor. As a logical fallacy, a conclusion that does not follow from a premise.
non serviam	I will not serve	Possibly derived from a Vulgate mistranslation of the Book of Jeremiah. Commonly used in literature as Satan's statement of disobedience to God, though in the original context the quote is attributed to Israel, not Satan.
non sibi	Not for self	A slogan used by many schools and universities.
non sibi solum	Not for self alone	A slogan used by many schools and universities.
non sibi, sed patriae	Not for self, but for country	Engraved on the doors of the United States Naval Academy chapel; motto of the USS Halyburton (FFG-40).
non sibi, sed suis	Not for one's self but for one's own	A slogan used by many schools and universities.
non sibi, sed omnibus	Not for one's self but for all	A slogan used by many schools and universities.
non sic dormit, sed vigilat	Sleeps not but is awake	Martin Luther on mortality of the soul.
non silba, sed anthar; Deo vindice	Not for self, but for others; God will vindicate	A slogan used by the Ku Klux Klan. Note that this is not accurate Latin but rather a mixture of Latin and Gothic
non sum qualis eram	I am not such as I was	Or "I am not the kind of person I once was". Expresses a change in the speaker. Horace, Odes 4/1:3.
non teneas aurum totum quod splendet ut aurum	Do not hold as gold all that shines as gold	Also, "All that glitters is not gold." Shakespeare in The Merchant of Venice.
non timebo mala	I will fear no evil	It is possibly a reference to Psalm 23. Printed on the Colt in Supernatural.
non vestra sed vos	Not yours but you	Motto of St Chad's College, Durham.
non vitae sed scholae	[We learn] not for life but for schooltime	From a passage of occupatio in Seneca the Younger's moral letters to Lucilius, wherein Lucilius is given the argument that too much literature fails to prepare students for life
non vi, sed verbo	Not by force, but by the word [of God]	From Martin Luther's Invocavit sermons preached in March 1522 against the Zwickau prophets unrest in Wittenberg; later echoed in the Augsburg Confession as ...sine vi humana, sed Verbo: bishops should act "without human force, but through the Word".
nosce te ipsum	know thyself	From Cicero, based on the Greek γνῶθι σεαυτόν (gnothi seauton), inscribed on the pronaos of the Temple of Apollo at Delphi, according to the Greek periegetic writer Pausanias (10.24.1). A non-traditional Latin rendering, temet nosce (thine own self know), is translated in The Matrix as "know thyself".
noscitur a sociis	a word is known by the company it keeps	In statutory interpretation, when a word is ambiguous, its meaning may be determined by reference to the rest of the statute.
noster nostri	Literally "Our ours"	Approximately "Our hearts beat as one."
nota bene (n.b.)	mark well	That is, "please note" or "note it well".
novus ordo seclorum	new order of the ages	From Virgil. Motto on the Great Seal of the United States. Similar to Novus Ordo Mundi (New World Order).
nulla dies sine linea	Not a day without a line drawn	Pliny the Elder attributes this maxim to Apelles, an ancient Greek artist.
nulla dies umquam memori vos eximet aevo	No day shall erase you from the memory of time	From Virgil's Aeneid, Book IX, line 447, on the episode of Nisus and Euryalus.
nulla poena sine lege	no penalty without a law	Refers to the legal principle that one cannot be punished for doing something that is not prohibited by law, and is related to Nullum crimen, nulla poena sine praevia lege poenali.
nulla quaestio	there is no question, there is no issue	
nulla tenaci invia est via	For the tenacious, no road is impassable	Motto of the Dutch car builder Spyker.
nullam rem natam	no thing born	That is, "nothing". It has been theorized that this expression is the origin of Italian nulla, French rien, and Spanish and Portuguese nada, all with the same meaning.
nulli secundus	second to none	Motto of the Coldstream Guards and Nine Squadron Royal Australian Corps of Transport and the Pretoria Armour Regiment.
nullius in verba	On the word of no man	Motto of the Royal Society.
nullum crimen, nulla poena sine praevia lege poenali	no crime, no punishment without a previous penal law	Legal principle meaning that one cannot be penalised for doing something that is not prohibited by law; penal law cannot be enacted retroactively.
nullum magnum ingenium sine mixtura dementiae fuit	There has been no great wisdom without an element of madness	From De Tranquillitate Animi, Seneca the Younger.
numen lumen	God our light	The motto of the University of Wisconsin–Madison. The motto of Elon University.
numerus clausus	closed number	A method to limit the number of students who may study at a university.
nunc aut nunquam	now or never	Motto of the Korps Commandotroepen, Dutch elite special forces.
nunc dimittis	now you send	beginning of the Song of Simeon, from the Gospel of Luke.
nunc est bibendum	now is the time to drink	Carpe-Diem-type phrase from the Odes of Horace, Nunc est bibendum, nunc pede libero pulsanda tellus (Now is the time to drink, now the time to dance footloose upon the earth). Used as a slogan by Michelin and the origin of the Michelin Man's name Bibendum.
nunc id vides, nunc ne vides	now you see it, now you don't	The motto of Unseen University from the Discworld books by Terry Pratchett.
nunc pro tunc	now for then	Something that has retroactive effect, is effective from an earlier date.
nunc scio quid sit amor	now I know what love is	From Virgil, Eclogues VIII.
nunquam minus solus quam cum solus	never less alone than when alone	
nunquam non paratus	never unprepared, ever ready, always ready	frequently used as motto, e.g. for the Scottish Clan Johnstone, where it is anglicized as "Ready, Aye, Ready"
nunquam obliviscar	never forget	
Nusquam est qui ubique est	He who is everywhere is nowhere	Seneca the Younger, second Epistulae Morales ad Lucilium

== O ==
Latin	Translation	Notes
O Deus ego amo te	O God I Love You	attributed to Saint Francis Xavier
O fortunatos nimium sua si bona norint, agricolas	The farmers would count themselves lucky, if only they knew how good they had it	from Virgil in Georgics II, 458
o homines ad servitutem paratos	Men ready to be slaves!	attributed (in Tacitus, Annales, III, 65) to the Roman Emperor Tiberius, in disgust at the servile attitude of Roman senators; said of those who should be leaders but instead slavishly follow the lead of others
O tempora, o mores!	Oh, the times! Oh, the morals!	also translated "What times! What customs!"; from Cicero, Catilina I, 2
O Tite tute Tati tibi tanta tyranne tulisti	O tyrant Titus Tatius, what terrible calamities you brought onto yourself!	from Quintus Ennius, Annales (104), considered an example of a Latin tongue-twister
Obedientia civium urbis felicitas	The obedience of the citizens makes us a happy city	Motto of Dublin
obiit (ob.)	one died	"He/she died", inscription on gravestones; ob. also sometimes stands for obiter (in passing or incidentally)
obit anis, abit onus	The old woman dies, the burden is lifted	Arthur Schopenhauer
obit caeleps	Ob. Cael. or died a bachelor (implying no legitimate offspring ever existed to inherit, cf. d.s.p., d.s.p.s. and d.s.p.m.)	Heraldic visitation or County Visitation Books for England
obiter dictum	a thing said in passing	in law, an observation by a judge on some point of law not directly relevant to the case before him, and thus neither requiring his decision nor serving as a precedent, but nevertheless of persuasive authority. In general, any comment, remark or observation made in passing
obliti privatorum, publica curate	Forget private affairs, take care of public ones	Roman political saying which reminds that common good should be given priority over private matters for any person having a responsibility in the State
obscuris vera involvens	the truth being enveloped by obscure things	from Virgil
obscurum per obscurius	the obscure by means of the more obscure	An explanation that is less clear than what it tries to explain; synonymous with ignotum per ignotius
obtineo et teneo	to obtain and to keep	motto
obtorto collo	with a twisted neck	unwillingly
oculus dexter (O.D.)	right eye	Ophthalmologist shorthand
oculus sinister (O.S.)	left eye	
oderint dum metuant	let them hate, so long as they fear	favorite saying of Caligula, attributed originally to Lucius Accius, Roman tragic poet (170 BC)
odi et amo	I hate and I love	opening of Catullus 85; the entire poem reads, "odi et amo quare id faciam fortasse requiris / nescio sed fieri sentio et excrucior" (I hate and I love. Why do I do this, you perhaps ask. / I do not know, but I feel it happening to me and I am burning up.)
odi profanum vulgus et arceo	I hate the unholy rabble and keep them away	Horace, Carmina III, 1
odium theologicum	theological hatred	name for the special hatred generated in theological disputes
oleum camino	(pour) oil on the fire	from Erasmus' (1466–1536) collection of annotated Adagia
omne ignotum pro magnifico	every unknown thing [is taken] for great	or "everything unknown appears magnificent" The source is Tacitus: Agricola, Book 1, 30 where the sentence ends with 'est'. The quotation is found in Arthur Conan Doyle's Sherlock Holmes short story "The Red-Headed League" (1891) where the 'est' is missing.
omne initium difficile est	every beginning is difficult	
omne vivum ex ovo	every living thing is from an egg	foundational concept of modern biology, opposing the theory of spontaneous generation
Omnes homines sunt asini vel homines et asini sunt asini	All men are donkeys or men and donkeys are donkeys	a sophisma proposed and solved by 14th-century Albert of Saxony
omnes vulnerant, postuma necat, or, omnes feriunt, ultima necat	all [the hours] wound, last one kills	usual in clocks, reminding the reader of death
omnia cum deo	all with God	motto for Mount Lilydale Mercy College, Lilydale, Victoria, Australia
omnia dicta fortiora si dicta Latina	everything said [is] stronger if said in Latin	or "everything sounds more impressive when said in Latin"; a more common phrase with the same meaning is quidquid Latine dictum sit altum videtur (whatever said in Latin, seems profound)
omnia in mensura et numero et pondere disposuisti	Thou hast ordered all things in measure, and number, and weight.	Book of Wisdom, 11:21
Omnia mea mecum porto	All that is mine I carry with me	is a quote that Cicero ascribes to Bias of Priene
omnia mirari etiam tritissima	Find wonder in all things, even the most commonplace	is a motto that is attributed to Carl Linnaeus
omnia mutantur, nihil interit	everything changes, nothing perishes	Ovid (43 BC – 17 AD), Metamorphoses, book XV, line 165
omnia omnibus	all things to all men	1 Corinthians 9:22
si omnia ficta	if all (the words of poets) is fiction	Ovid, Metamorphoses, book XIII, lines 733–4: "si non omnia vates ficta"
omnia vincit amor	love conquers all	Virgil (70 BC – 19 BC), Eclogue X, line 69
omnia munda mundis	everything [is] pure to the pure [men]	from The New Testament
omnia praesumuntur legitime facta donec probetur in contrarium	all things are presumed to be lawfully done, until it is shown [to be] in the reverse	in other words, "innocent until proven guilty"
omnia sponte fluant absit violentia rebus	everything should flow by itself, force should be absent	"let it go"
omnia sunt communia	all things shall be held in common	from Acts of the Apostles
omnis vir enim sui	Every man for himself!	
omnibus idem	the same to all	motto of Pieter Corneliszoon Hooft, usually accompanied by a sun, which shines for (almost) everyone
omnibus locis fit caedes	There is slaughter everywhere (in every place)	Julius Caesar's The Gallic War, 7.67
omnis traductor traditor	every translator is a traitor	every translation is a corruption of the original; the reader should take heed of unavoidable imperfections
omnis vir tigris	everyone a tiger	motto of the 102nd Intelligence Wing
omnium gatherum	gathering of all	miscellaneous collection or assortment; "gatherum" is English, and the term is used often used facetiously
onus probandi	burden of proof	
onus procedendi	burden of procedure	burden of a party to adduce evidence that a case is an exception to the rule
opera omnia	all works	collected works of an author
opera posthuma	posthumous works	works published after the author's death
operari sequitur esse	act of doing something follows the act of being	scholastic phrase, used to explain that there is no possible act if there is not being: being is absolutely necessary for any other act
opere citato (op. cit.)	in the work that was cited	used in academic works when referring again to the last source mentioned or used
opere et veritate	in action and truth	doing what you believe is morally right through everyday actions
opere laudato (op. laud.)		See opere citato
operibus anteire	leading the way with deeds	to speak with actions instead of words
ophidia in herba	a snake in the grass	any hidden danger or unknown risk
opinio juris sive necessitatis	an opinion of law or necessity	a belief that an action was undertaken because it was a legal necessity; source of customary law
opus anglicanum	English work	fine embroidery, especially used to describe church vestments
Opus Dei	The Work of God	Catholic organisation
ora et labora	pray and work	This principle of the Benedictine monasteries reads in full: "Ora et labora (et lege), Deus adest sine mora." "Pray and work (and read), God is there without delay" (or to keep the rhyme: "Work and pray, and God is there without delay")
ora pro nobis	pray for us	"Sancta Maria, mater Dei, ora pro nobis peccatoribus"; Brazilian name for Pereskia aculeata
orando laborando	by praying, by working	motto of Rugby School
oratio recta	direct speech	expressions from Latin grammar
oratio obliqua	indirect speech	expressions from Latin grammar
oratio pro domo	speech for [one's own] house	also abbreviated pro domo; speak on one's own behalf; based on a speech by Cicero in legal proceedings in 57 AD to regain his house on the Palatine Hill that was confiscated during his exile
orbis non sufficit	the world does not suffice or the world is not enough	from Satires of Juvenal (Book IV/10), referring to Alexander the Great; James Bond's adopted family motto in the novel On Her Majesty's Secret Service; it made a brief appearance in the film adaptation of the same name and was later used as the title of the nineteenth James Bond film, The World Is Not Enough.
orbis unum	one world	seen in The Legend of Zorro
ordo ab chao	out of chaos, comes order	one of the oldest mottos of Scottish Rite Freemasonry.
(oremus) pro invicem	(Let us pray), one for the other; let us pray for each other	Popular salutation for Roman Catholic clergy at the beginning or ending of a letter or note. Usually abbreviated OPI. ("Oremus" used alone is just "let us pray").
orta recens quam pura nites	newly risen, how brightly you shine	Motto of New South Wales

== P ==
Latin	Translation	Notes
pace	[with] peace [to]	"With all due respect to", "with due deference to", "by leave of", "no offence to", or "despite (with respect)". Used to politely acknowledge someone with whom the speaker or writer disagrees or finds irrelevant to the main argument. Ablative form of pax, "peace."
pace ac bello merita	Service during peace and war	Motto of the US Federal Emergency Management Agency shown on its flag
pace tua	with your peace	Thus, "with your permission"
Pacem in terris	Peace on Earth	1963 encyclical by Pope John XXIII
pacta sunt servanda	agreements must be kept	Also "contracts must be honoured". Indicates the binding power of treaties. One of the fundamental rules of international law.
palma non sine pulvere	no reward without effort	Also "dare to try"; motto of numerous schools.
palmam qui meruit ferat	He who has earned the palm, let him bear it.	Loosely, "achievement should be rewarded" (or, "let the symbol of victory go to him who has deserved it"); frequently used motto
panem et circenses	bread and circuses	From Juvenal, Satires, book IV, satire X, line 81. Originally described all that was needed for emperors to placate the Roman mob. Today used to describe any entertainment used to distract public attention from more important matters.
par sit fortuna labori	Let the success be equal to the labor.	This motto is of the families Buchanan, Lowman, and Palmer, according to Burke's Peerage & Baronetage.
parvus pendetur fur, magnus abire videtur	The petty thief is hanged, the big thief gets away.	
para bellum	prepare for war	From "Si vis pacem para bellum": if you want peace, prepare for war—if a country is ready for war, its enemies are less likely to attack. Usually used to support a policy of peace through strength (deterrence). In antiquity, however, the Romans viewed peace as the aftermath of successful conquest through war, so in this sense the proverb identifies war as the means through which peace will be achieved.
parare Domino plebem perfectam	to prepare for God a perfect people	motto of the St. Jean Baptiste High School
parati vero parati	ready aye ready	The motto of the Royal Canadian Navy.
parce sepulto	forgive the interred	it is ungenerous to hold resentment toward the dead. Quote from the Aeneid, III 13-68.
parens patriae	parent of the nation	A public policy requiring courts to protect the best interests of any child involved in a lawsuit. See also Pater Patriae.
pari passu	with equal step	Thus, "moving together", "simultaneously", etc. Also used to abbreviate the principle that in bankruptcy creditors must all get the same proportion of their debt.
parturiunt montes, nascetur ridiculus mus	The mountains are in labour, a ridiculous mouse will be born.	said of works that promise much at the outset but yield little in the end (Horace, Ars poetica 137) – see also The Mountain in Labour
parum luceat	It does not shine [being darkened by shade].	Quintilian, Institutio Oratoria, 1/6:34 – see also lucus a nonlucendo
parva sub ingenti	the small under the huge	Implies that the weak are under the protection of the strong, rather than that they are inferior. Motto of Prince Edward Island.
parvis imbutus tentabis grandia tutus	When you are steeped in little things, you shall safely attempt great things.	Motto of Barnard Castle School, sometimes translated as "Once you have accomplished small things, you may attempt great ones safely".
passim	here and there, everywhere	Less literally, "throughout" or "frequently". Said of a word, fact or notion that occurs several times in a cited text. Also used in proofreading, where it refers to a change that is to be repeated everywhere needed. See also et passim.
pater familias	father of the family	Or "master of the house". The eldest male in a family, who held patria potestas ("paternal power"). In Roman law, a father had enormous power over his children, wife, and slaves, though these rights dwindled over time. Derived from the phrase pater familias, an Old Latin expression preserving the archaic -as ending for the genitive case.
Pater Omnipotens	Father Almighty	A more direct translation would be "omnipotent father".
Pater Patriae	father of the nation	A Latin honorific meaning "Father of the Country", or more literally, "Father of the Fatherland".
pater peccavi	Father, I have sinned	The traditional beginning of a Roman Catholic confession.
pauca sed bona	few, but good	Similar to "quality over quantity"; though there may be few of something, at least they are of good quality.
pauca sed matura	few, but ripe	Said to be one of Carl Gauss's favorite quotations. Used in The King and I by Rodgers and Hammerstein.
paulatim ergo certe	slowly therefore surely	Former motto of Latymer Upper School in London (the text latim er is concealed in the words)
paulatim sed firmiter	slowly but surely	Motto of University College School in London
pax aeterna	eternal peace	A common epitaph
Pax Americana	American Peace	A euphemism for the United States of America and its sphere of influence. Adapted from Pax Romana.
Pax Britannica	British Peace	A euphemism for the British Empire. Adapted from Pax Romana
Pax Christi	Peace of Christ	Used as a wish before the Holy Communion in the Catholic Mass, also the name of the peace movement Pax Christi
pax Dei	peace of God	Used in the Peace and Truce of God movement in 10th-century France
Pax Deorum	Peace of the gods	Like the vast majority of inhabitants of the ancient world, the Romans practiced pagan rituals, believing it important to achieve a state of Pax Deorum (The Peace of the gods) instead of Ira Deorum (The Wrath of the gods).
Pax, Domine	peace, lord	lord or master; used as a form of address when speaking to clergy or educated professionals
pax et bonum	peace and the good	Motto of St. Francis of Assisi and, consequently, of his monastery in Assisi; understood by Catholics to mean 'Peace and Goodness be with you,' as is similar in the Mass; translated in Italian as pace e bene.
pax et justitia	peace and justice	Motto of Saint Vincent and the Grenadines
pax et lux	peace and light	Motto of Tufts University and various schools
Pax Europaea	European Peace	euphemism for Europe after World War II
Pax Hispanica	Spanish Peace	Euphemism for the Spanish Empire; specifically can mean the twenty-three years of supreme Spanish dominance in Europe (approximately 1598–1621). Adapted from Pax Romana.
pax in terra	peace on earth	Used to exemplify the desired state of peace on earth
Pax Indica	Indian Peace	Term for hegemony of India in its sphere of influence; adapted from Pax Romana; also a 2012 book by Shashi Tharoor
Pax intrantibus, salus exeuntibus	Peace to those who enter, health to those who depart.	Used as an inscription over the entrance of buildings (especially homes, monasteries, inns). Often benedicto habitantibus (Blessings on those who abide here) is added.
pax matrum, ergo pax familiarum	peace of mothers, therefore peace of families	If the mother is peaceful, then the family is peaceful. The inverse of the Southern United States saying, "If mama ain't happy, ain't nobody happy."
Pax Mongolica	Mongolian Peace	period of peace and prosperity in Asia during the Mongol Empire
pax optima rerum	peace is the greatest good	Silius Italicus, Punica (11,595); motto of the university of Kiel
Pax Romana	Roman Peace	period of relative prosperity and lack of conflict in the early Roman Empire
Pax Sinica	Chinese Peace	period of peace in East Asia during times of strong Chinese hegemony
Pax tecum	peace be with you (singular)	
Pax tibi, Marce, Evangelista meus. Hic requiescet corpus tuum.	Peace to you, Mark, my Evangelist. Here will rest your body.	Legend states that when the evangelist went to the lagoon where Venice would later be founded, an angel came and said this. The first part is depicted as the note in the book shown opened by the lion of St Mark's Basilica, Venice; registered trademark of the Assicurazioni Generali, Trieste.
pax vobiscum	peace [be] with you	A common farewell. The "you" is plural ("you all"), so the phrase must be used when speaking to more than one person; pax tecum is the form used when speaking to only one person.
peccavi	I have sinned	Telegraph message and pun from Charles Napier, British general, upon completely subjugating the Indian province of Sindh in 1842 ('I have Sindh'). This is, arguably, the most terse military despatch ever sent. The story is apocryphal.
pecunia non olet	money doesn't smell	According to Suetonius' De vita Caesarum, when Emperor Vespasian was challenged by his son Titus for taxing the public lavatories, the emperor held up a coin before his son and asked whether it smelled or simply said non olet ("it doesn't smell"). From this, the phrase was expanded to pecunia non olet, or rarely aes non olet ("copper doesn't smell").
pecunia, si uti scis, ancilla est; si nescis, domina	if you know how to use money, money is your slave; if you don't, money is your master	Written on an old Latin tablet in downtown Verona (Italy).
pede poena claudo	punishment comes limping	That is, retribution comes slowly but surely. From Horace, Odes, 3, 2, 32.
pendent opera interrupta	the works hang interrupted	From the Aeneid of Virgil, Book IV
per	By, through, by means of	See specific phrases below
per angusta ad augusta	through difficulties to greatness	Joining sentence of the conspirators in the drama Hernani by Victor Hugo (1830). The motto of numerous educational establishments.
per annum (pa.)	each year	Thus, "yearly"—occurring every year
per ardua	through adversity	Motto of the British RAF Regiment
per ardua ad alta	through difficulty to heights	Through hardship, great heights are reached; frequently used motto
per ardua ad astra	through adversity to the stars	Motto of the Royal, Royal Australian and Royal New Zealand Air Forces, the U. S. State of Kansas and of several schools. The phrase is used by Latin Poet Virgil in the Aeneid; also used in H. Rider Haggard's novel The People of the Mist.
per aspera ad astra	through hardships to the stars	From Seneca the Younger; frequently used motto, sometimes as ad astra per aspera ("to the stars through hardships")
per capita	by heads	"Per head", i.e., "per person", a ratio by the number of persons. The singular is per caput.
per capsulam	through the small box	That is, "by letter"
per contra	through the contrary	Or "on the contrary" (cf. a contrario)
per crucem vincemus	through the cross we shall conquer	Motto of St John Fisher Catholic High School, Dewsbury
Per Crucem Crescens	through the cross, growth	Motto of Lambda Chi Alpha
per curiam	through the senate	Legal term meaning "by the court", as in a per curiam decision
per definitionem	through the definition	Thus, "by definition"
per diem (pd.)	by day	Thus, "per day". A specific amount of money an organization allows an individual to spend per day, typically for travel expenses.
per fas et nefas	through right or wrong	By fair means or foul
per fidem intrepidus	fearless through faith	
per incuriam	through inadvertence or carelessness	Legal term referring to a decision that was made by a court through a clear mistake or unawareness of something, such as forgetting to take some binding precedent into account
per literas regias per lit. reg. per regias literas per reg. lit. etc.	by royal letters	by letters patent; of academic degrees: awarded by letters patent from the King/Queen, rather than by a University
per mare per terram	by sea and by land	Motto of the Royal Marines and (with small difference) of Clan Donald and the Compagnies Franches de la Marine
per mensem (pm.)	by month	Thus, "per month", or "monthly"
per multum cras, cras, crebro dilabitur aetas	what can be done today should not be delayed	
per os (p.o.)	through the mouth	Medical shorthand for "by mouth"
per pedes	by feet	Used of a certain place that can be traversed or reached by foot, or to indicate that one is travelling by foot as opposed to by a vehicle
per procura (p.p. or per pro)	through the agency	Also rendered per procurationem. Used to indicate that a person is signing a document on behalf of another person. Correctly placed before the name of the person signing, but often placed before the name of the person on whose behalf the document is signed, sometimes through incorrect translation of the alternative abbreviation per pro. as "for and on behalf of".
per quod	by reason of which	In a UK legal context: "by reason of which" (as opposed to per se which requires no reasoning). In American jurisprudence often refers to a spouse's claim for loss of consortium.
per rectum (pr)	through the rectum	Medical shorthand; see also per os
per rectum ad astra	via rectum to the stars	a modern parody of per aspera ad astra, originating and most commonly used in Russia, meaning that the path to success took you through most undesirable and objectionable places or environments; or that a found solution to a complex problem is extremely convoluted.
per risum multum poteris cognoscere stultum	by excessive laughter one can recognise the fool	
per scientiam ad salutem	through science to health	Motto of The Michener Institute
per se	through itself	Also "by itself" or "in itself". Without referring to anything else, intrinsically, taken without qualifications etc. A common example is negligence per se. See also malum in se.
per stirpes	through the roots	Used in wills to indicate that each "branch" of the testator's family should inherit equally. Contrasted with per capita.
per unitatem vis	through unity, strength	Motto of Texas A&M University Corps of Cadets
per veritatem vis	through truth, strength	Motto of Washington University in St. Louis
per volar sunata^{[sic]}	born to soar	Frequently used motto; not from Latin but from Dante's Purgatorio, Canto XII, 95, the Italian phrase "per volar sù nata".
Perfer et obdura; dolor hic tibi proderit olim	Be patient and tough; some day this pain will be useful to you.	From Ovid, Amores, Book III, Elegy XI
periculum in mora	danger in delay	
perinde ac [si] cadaver [essent]	[well-disciplined] like a corpse	Phrase written by St. Ignatius of Loyola in his Constitutiones Societatis Iesu (1954)
perita manus mens exculta	skilled hand, cultivated mind	Motto of RMIT University in Melbourne, Australia
perge sequar	advance, I follow	from Virgil's Aeneid IV 114; in Vergil's context: "proceed with your plan, I will do my part."
Pericula ludus	Danger is my pleasure	Motto of the Foreign Legion Detachment in Mayotte
perpetuum mobile	thing in perpetual motion	A musical term; also used to refer to hypothetical perpetual motion machines
Perseverantia et Fide in Deo	Perseverance and Faith in God	Motto of Bombay Scottish School, Mahim, India
persona non grata	person not pleasing	An unwelcome, unwanted or undesirable person. In diplomatic contexts, a person rejected by the host government. The reverse, persona grata ("pleasing person"), is less common, and refers to a diplomat acceptable to the government of the country to which he is sent.
Pes meus stetit in directo	My foot has stood in the right way (or in uprightness; in integrity)	Motto of the Light Armoured Cavalry Regiment Santiago No 1, Spanish Army; Psalm 26:12
petitio principii	request of the beginning	Begging the question, a logical fallacy in which a proposition to be proved is implicitly or explicitly assumed in one of the premises
pia desideria	pious longings	Or "dutiful desires"
pia fraus	pious fraud	Or "dutiful deceit". Expression from Ovid; used to describe deception which serves Church purposes
pia mater	pious mother	Or "tender mother". The delicate innermost of the three membranes that cover the brain and spinal cord.
Pietate et doctrina tuta libertas	Freedom is made safe through character and learning	Motto of Dickinson College
pinxit	one painted	Thus, "he painted this" or "she painted this". Formerly used on works of art, next to the artist's name.
piscem natare doces	[you] teach a fish to swim	Latin proverb, attributed by Erasmus in his Adagia to Greek origin (Diogenianus, Ἰχθὺν νήχεσθαι διδάσκεις); corollary Chinese idiom (班門弄斧)
piscis primum a capite foetet	the fish stinks first from the head	Found in Erasmus's Adages; similarly in Greek (Ἰχθὺς ἐκ τῆς κεφαλῆς ὄζειν ἄρχεται), fifteenth century CE Paroemiae of Michael Apostolius Paroemiographus.
placet	it pleases	expression of assent
plaudite, cives	applaud, citizens	Said by ancient comic actors to solicit the audience's applause
plene scriptum	fully written	
plenus venter non studet libenter	A full belly does not like studying	I.e., it is difficult to concentrate on mental tasks after a heavy meal. The following variant is also attested: plenus si venter renuit studere libenter (the belly, when full, refuses to study willingly).
plenus venter facile de ieiuniis disputat	A full belly readily discusses fasting.	Hieronymus, Epistulæ 58,2
plurale tantum pl. pluralia tantum	plural only	nouns that only occur in the plural form
pluralis majestatis	plural of majesty	The first-person plural pronoun when used by an important personage to refer to himself or herself; also known as the "royal we"
pluralis modestiae	plural of modesty	
plus minusve (p.m.v.)	more or less	Frequently found on Roman funerary inscriptions to denote that the age of a decedent is approximate
plus ultra	further beyond	National motto of Spain and a number of other institutions
pollice compresso favor iudicabatur	goodwill decided by compressed thumb	Life was spared with a thumb tucked inside a closed fist, simulating a sheathed weapon. Conversely, a thumb up meant to unsheath your sword.
pollice verso	with a turned thumb	Used by Roman crowds to pass judgment on a defeated gladiator. The type of gesture used is uncertain. Also the name of a famous painting depicting gladiators by Jean-Léon Gérôme.
Polonia Restituta	Rebirth of Poland	
pons asinorum	bridge of asses	Any obstacle that stupid people find hard to cross. Originally used of Euclid's Fifth Proposition in geometry.
pontifex maximus	greatest high priest	Or "supreme pontiff". Originally an office in the Roman Republic, later a title held by Roman emperors, and later a traditional epithet of the pope. The pontifices were the most important priestly college of the religion in ancient Rome; their name is usually thought to derive from pons facere ("to make a bridge"), which in turn is usually linked to their religious authority over the bridges of Rome, especially the Pons Sublicius.
posse comitatus	force of the county	Thus, to be able to be made into part of a retinue or force. In common law, a sheriff's right to compel people to assist law enforcement in unusual situations.
possunt quia posse videntur	They can because they think they can	Inscription on the back of Putney medals, awarded to boat race winning Oxford blues. From Virgil's Aeneid Book V line 231. Also the motto of Foster's School, Sherborne, Dorset (1640-1992).
post aut propter	after it or by means of it	Causality between two phenomena is not established (cf. post hoc, ergo propter hoc)
post cibum (p.c.)	after food	Medical shorthand for "after meals" (cf. ante cibum)
post coitum	After sex	After sexual intercourse
post coitum omne animal triste est sive gallus et mulier	After sexual intercourse every animal is sad, except the cock (rooster) and the woman	Or: triste est omne animal post coitum, praeter mulierem gallumque. Attributed to Galen of Pergamum.
post eventum	after the event	Refers to an action or occurrence that takes place after the event that is being discussed (similar in meaning to post factum). More specifically, it may refer to a person who is recounting an event long after it took place, implying that details of the story may have changed over time. (Some sources attribute this expression to George Eliot.)
post factum	after the fact	Not to be confused with ex post facto.
post festum	after the feast	Too late, or after the fact
post hoc ergo propter hoc	after this, therefore because of this	A logical fallacy where one assumes that one thing happening after another thing means that the first thing caused the second.
post meridiem (p.m.)	after midday	The period from noon to midnight (cf. ante meridiem)
post mortem (pm)	after death	Usually rendered postmortem. Not to be confused with post meridiem
Post mortem auctoris (p.m.a.)	after the author's death	The phrase is used in legal terminology in the context of intellectual property rights, especially copyright, which commonly lasts until a certain number of years after the author's death.
post nubila phoebus	after the clouds, the sun	Motto of the University of Zulia, Venezuela, as well as Hartford, Connecticut
post nubes lux	out of darkness, light	Motto of Cranfield University
post scriptum (p.s.)	after what has been written	A postscript. Used to mark additions to a letter, after the signature. Can be extended to post post scriptum (p.p.s.), etc.
post tenebras lux, or, post tenebras spero lucem	after darkness, [I hope for] light	from Vulgata, Job 17:12; frequently used motto
postera crescam laude	I am going to grow in the esteem of future generations	Motto of the University of Melbourne
praemia virtutis honores	honours are the rewards of virtue	Motto of the Portsmouth Grammar School
praemonitus praemunitus	forewarned is forearmed	Common catch phrase of the title character of the novel Captain Blood
praesis ut prosis	Lead in order to serve.	Motto of Lancaster Royal Grammar School
praestant interna (coronae)	what is inside is better (than the crown)	Motto emphasizing that a person excels primarily through their inner virtues rather than their physical attributes or social rank—a topos in classical rhetoric, inspired in particular by the biblical figure of David who, according to the Old Testament (1 Samuel 17), triumphed over Goliath through faith, bravery and tactical intelligence, despite a physical disadvantage. The theme is also recurrent in Greco-Roman mythology, for instance in the Labours of Hercules or Homer's Odyssey. Historically, court artists used this motto as a propaganda tool to reinforce the legitimacy of sovereigns—particularly absolute or divine right monarchs like Louis XIV—by praising their personal merits over mere hereditary claims to the crown, as in L'Automne (Autumn) by Charles Le Brun. The motto was sometimes associated with the symbol of the pomegranate whose tasty arils are hidden inside a tough epicarp topped by a persistent calyx shaped like a crown or, when viewed from above, like the six-pointed Star of David, the pomegranate being, in Judeo-Christian and Masonic iconography and ornamentation, a traditional symbol of biblical royalty.
praeter legem	after the law	Legal terminology, international law
Praga Caput Regni	Prague, Head of the Kingdom	Motto of Prague from Middle Ages
Praga Caput Rei publicae	Prague, Head of the Republic	Motto of Prague from 1991
Praga mater urbium	Prague, Mother of Cities	Motto of Prague from 1927
Praga totius Bohemiae domina	Prague, the mistress of the whole of Bohemia	Former motto of Prague
pretium laborum non vile	No mean reward for labour	Motto of the Order of the Golden Fleece
pretiumque et causa laboris	The prize and the cause of our labour	Motto of Burnley Football Club; from Ovid's Metamorphoses, 4.739 (Latin)/English): "The Tale of Perseus and Andromeda": resoluta catenis incedit virgo, pretiumque et causa laboris. ("freed of her chains the virgin approaches, cause and reward of the enterprise.")
prima facie	at first sight	Used to designate evidence in a trial which is suggestive, but not conclusive, of something (e.g., a person's guilt)
prima luce	at dawn	Literally "at first light"
primas sum: primatum nil a me alienum puto	I am a primate; nothing about primates is foreign to me	A sentence by the American anthropologist Earnest Hooton and the slogan of primatologists and lovers of primates. Derived from homo sum, humani a me nihil alienum puto.
primum mobile	first moving thing	Or "first thing able to be moved"; see primum movens
primum movens	prime mover	Or "first moving one". A common theological term, such as in the cosmological argument, based on the assumption that God was the first entity to "move" or "cause" anything. Aristotle was one of the first philosophers to discuss the "uncaused cause", a hypothetical originator—and violator—of causality.
primum non nocere	first, to not harm	A medical precept. Often falsely attributed to the Hippocratic Oath, though its true source is probably a paraphrase from Hippocrates' Epidemics, where he wrote, "Declare the past, diagnose the present, foretell the future; practice these acts. As to diseases, make a habit of two things: to help, or at least to do no harm."
primus inter pares	first among equals	Position of the Ecumenical Patriarch in the Eastern Orthodox Church, position of the President of the Swiss Confederation among the members of the Federal Council, and a title of the Roman Emperors (cf. princeps).
principia probant non probantur	principles prove; they are not proved	Fundamental principles require no proof; they are assumed a priori.
principiis obsta (et respice finem)	resist the beginnings (and consider the end)	Ovid, Remedia Amoris, 91
principium individuationis	Individuation	psychological term: the self-formation of the personality into a coherent whole
prior tempore potior iure	earlier in time, stronger in law	“First in time, greater in right.”A maxim meaning that the law favors those who establish their rights earlier rather than later. This principle is often cited in private law to support the claims of prior creditors over later creditors.
pro aris et focis	For altars and hearths	The motto of the Royal Queensland Regiment, and many other regiments.
pro bono publico	for the public good	Often abbreviated pro bono. Work undertaken voluntarily at no expense, such as public services. Often used of a lawyer's work that is not charged for.
pro Brasilia fiant eximia	let exceptional things be made for Brazil	Motto of São Paulo state, Brazil.
pro Deo Domo Patria	For God, home and country	Motto of the University of Mary Washington
pro Deo et Patria	For God and Country	Frequently used motto
pro domo (sua)	for (one’s own) home or house	serving the interests of a given perspective or for the benefit of a given group.
pro Ecclesia, pro Texana	For Church, For Texas	Motto of Baylor University, a private Christian Baptist university in Waco, Texas.
pro fide et patria	for faith and fatherland	Motto of the originally Irish Muldoon family and of several schools, such as the Diocesan College (Bishops) in Cape Town, South Africa, and All Hallows High School in the Bronx, New York.
pro forma	for form	Or "as a matter of form". Prescribing a set form or procedure, or performed in a set manner.
pro gloria et patria	for glory and fatherland	Motto of Prussia
pro hac vice	for this occasion	Request of a state court to allow an out-of-state lawyer to represent a client.
pro multis	for many	It is part of the Rite of Consecration of the wine in Western Christianity tradition, as part of the Mass.
pro parte	in part	Frequently used in taxonomy to refer to part of a group.
pro patria	for country	Pro Patria Medal: for operational service (minimum 55 days) in defence of the Republic South Africa or in the prevention or suppression of terrorism; issued for the Border War (counter-insurgency operations in South West Africa 1966–89) and for campaigns in Angola (1975–76 and 1987–88). Motto of The Royal Canadian Regiment, Royal South Australia Regiment, Hurlstone Agricultural High School.
pro patria vigilans	watchful for the country	Motto of the United States Army Signal Corps.
pro populo et gloria	for the people and glory	Motto of HMS Westminster
pro per	for self	to defend oneself in court without counsel; abbreviation of propria persona. See also: pro se.
pro rata	for the rate	i.e., proportionately.
pro re nata (PRN, prn)	for a thing that has been born	Medical shorthand for "as the occasion arises" or "as needed". Also "concerning a matter having come into being". Used to describe a meeting of a special Presbytery or Assembly called to discuss something new, and which was previously unforeseen (literally: "concerning a matter having been born").
pro rege et lege	for king and the law	Found on the Leeds coat of arms.
pro rege, lege et grege	for king, the law and the people	Found on the coat of arms of Perth, Scotland.
pro se	for oneself	to defend oneself in court without counsel. Some jurisdictions prefer, "pro per".
pro scientia atque sapientia	for knowledge and wisdom	motto of Stuyvesant High School in New York City
pro scientia et patria	for science and nation	motto of the National University of La Plata
pro studio et labore	for study and work	
pro tanto	for so much	Denotes something that has only been partially fulfilled. A philosophical term indicating the acceptance of a theory or idea without fully accepting the explanation.
pro tanto quid retribuemus	what shall we give in return for so much	The motto of the city of Belfast; taken from the Vulgate translation of Psalm 116.
pro tempore	for the time (being)	Denotes a temporary current situation; abbreviated pro tem.
probatio pennae	testing of the pen	Medieval Latin term for breaking in a new pen
probis pateo	I am open for honest people	Traditionally inscribed above a city gate or above the front entrance of a dwelling or place of learning.
procedendo	to be proceeded with	From procedendo ad judicium, "to be proceeded with to judgment." A prerogative writ, by which a superior court requires an inferior one to rule on a matter it has neglected.
prodesse quam conspici	To Accomplish Rather Than To Be Conspicuous	motto of Miami University
prohibito	I prohibit	A prerogative writ, by which a superior court prohibits an inferior court from hearing a matter outside its jurisdiction; also called a writ of prohibition.
propria manu (p.m.)	"by one's own hand"	
propter vitam vivendi perdere causas	to destroy the reasons for living for the sake of life	That is, to squander life's purpose just in order to stay alive, and live a meaningless life. From Juvenal, Satyricon VIII, verses 83–84.
protectio trahit subjectionem, et subjectio protectionem	Protection draws allegiance, and allegiance draws protection	Legal maxim, indicating that reciprocity of fealty with protection
provehito in altum	launch forward into the deep	motto of Memorial University of Newfoundland
proxime accessit	he came next	the runner-up
proximo mense (prox.)	in the following month	Used in formal correspondence to refer to the next month. Used with ult. ("last month") and inst. ("this month").
pulchrum est paucorum hominum	Beauty is for the few	from Friedrich Nietzsche's 1889 book Twilight of the Idols
pulvis et umbra sumus	we are dust and shadow	From Horace, Carmina Book IV, 7, 16.
punctum saliens	leaping point	Thus, the essential or most notable point. The salient point.
purificatus non consumptus	purified, not consumed	

== Q ==
Latin	Translation	Notes
qua definitione	by virtue of definition	Thus: "by definition"; variant of per definitionem; sometimes used in German-speaking countries. Occasionally misrendered as "qua definitionem".
qua patet orbis	as far as the world extends	Motto of the Royal Netherlands Marine Corps
quae cum ita sint	these things being the case	Or, "since these things are the case" or "Since things are this way". Cicero.
quae non posuisti, ne tollas	do not take away what you did not put in place	Plato, Laws
quae non prosunt singula multa iuvant	what alone is not useful helps when accumulated	Ovid, Remedia amoris
quaecumque sunt vera	whatsoever is true	frequently used as motto; taken from Philippians 4:8 of the Bible
quaecumque vera doce me	teach me whatsoever is true	motto of St. Joseph's College, Edmonton at the University of Alberta
quaere	to seek	Or "you might ask..." Used to suggest doubt or to ask one to consider whether something is correct. Often introduces rhetorical or tangential questions.
quaerite primum regnum Dei	seek ye first the kingdom of God	Also quaerite primo regnum dei; frequently used as motto (e.g. Newfoundland and Labrador)
qualis artifex pereo	As what kind of artist do I perish?	Or "What a craftsman dies in me!" Attributed to Nero in Suetonius' De vita Caesarum
Qualitas potentia nostra	Quality is our might	motto of Finnish Air Force
quam bene non quantum	how well, not how much	motto of Mount Royal University, Calgary, Canada
quam bene vivas referre (or refert), non quam diu	it is how well you live that matters, not how long	Seneca, Epistulae morales ad Lucilium CI (101)
quamdiu (se) bene gesserit	as long as he shall have behaved well (legal Latin)	I.e., "[while on] good behavior." So for example the Act of Settlement 1701 stipulated that judges' commissions are valid quamdiu se bene gesserint (during good behaviour). (Notice the different singular, "gesserit", and plural, "gesserint", forms.) It was from this phrase that Frank Herbert extracted the name for the Bene Gesserit sisterhood in the Dune novels.
quantocius quantotius	the sooner, the better	or, as quickly as possible
quantum libet (q.l.)	as much as pleases	medical shorthand for "as much as you wish"
quantum sufficit (qs)	as much as is enough	medical shorthand for "as much as needed" or "as much as will suffice"
quaque hora (qh)	every hour	medical shorthand; also quaque die (qd), "every day", quaque mane (qm), "every morning", and quaque nocte (qn), "every night"
quare clausum fregit	wherefore he broke the close	An action of trespass; thus called, by reason the writ demands the person summoned to answer to wherefore he broke the close (quare clausum fregit), i.e. why he committed such a trespass.
quater in die (qid)	four times a day	medical shorthand
quem deus vult perdere, dementat prius	Whom the gods would destroy, they first make mad	
quem di diligunt adulescens moritur	he whom the gods love dies young	Other translations of diligunt include "prize especially" or "esteem". From Plautus, Bacchides, IV, 7, 18. In this comic play, a sarcastic servant says this to his aging master. The rest of the sentence reads: dum valet sentit sapit ("while he is healthy, perceptive and wise").
questio quid iuris	I ask what law?	from the Summoner's section of Chaucer's General Prologue to The Canterbury Tales, line 648
qui audet adipiscitur	Who Dares Wins	The motto of the SAS, of the British Army
qui bene cantat bis orat	He who sings well praises twice	from St. Augustine of Hippo's commentary on Psalm 73, verse 1: Qui enim cantat laudem, non solum laudat, sed etiam hilariter laudat ("He who sings praises, not only praises, but praises joyfully")
qui bono	who with good	common misspelling of the Latin phrase cui bono ("who benefits?")
qui docet in doctrina	he that teacheth, on teaching	Motto of the University of Chester. A less literal translation is "Let those who teach, teach" or "Let the teacher teach".
qui gladio ferit gladio perit	He who strikes a sword dies by the sword	Or "live by the sword, die by the sword"; derived from Jesus's words in the garden of Gethsemane in the Gospel of Matthew 26:52, Omnes enim, qui acceperint gladium, gladio peribunt (for all who take up the sword shall perish by the sword).
qui habet aures audiendi audiat	he who has ears to hear, let him hear	"He that hath ears to hear, let him hear"; Mark Mark 4:9
qui me tangit, vocem meam audit	who touches me, hears my voice	common inscription on bells
qui tacet consentire videtur	he who is silent is taken to agree	Thus, silence gives consent. Sometimes accompanied by the proviso "ubi loqui debuit ac potuit", that is, "when he ought to have spoken and was able to". Pope Boniface VII in Decretale di Bonifacio VIII, Libro V, Tit. 12, reg. 43 AD 1294
qui prior est tempore potior est jure	Who is first in point of time is stronger in right	As set forth in the "Property Law" casebook written by Jesse Dukeminier, which is generally used to teach first year law students.
qui tam pro domino rege quam pro se ipso in hac parte sequitur	he who brings an action for the king as well as for himself	Generally known as 'qui tam,' it is the technical legal term for the unique mechanism in the federal False Claims Act that allows persons and entities with evidence of fraud against federal programs or contracts to sue the wrongdoer on behalf of the Government.
qui totum vult totum perdit	he who wants everything loses everything	Attributed to Publilius Syrus
qui transtulit sustinet	he who transplanted still sustains	Or "he who brought us across still supports us", meaning God. State motto of Connecticut. Originally written as sustinet qui transtulit in 1639.
quia suam uxorem etiam suspicione vacare vellet	because he should wish his wife to be free even from any suspicion	Attributed to Julius Caesar by Plutarch, Caesar 10. Translated loosely as "because even the wife of Caesar may not be suspected". At the feast of Bona Dea, a sacred festival for females only, which was being held at the Domus Publica, the home of the Pontifex Maximus, Caesar, and hosted by his second wife, Pompeia, the notorious politician Clodius arrived in disguise. Caught by the outraged noblewomen, Clodius fled before they could kill him on the spot for sacrilege. In the ensuing trial, allegations arose that Pompeia and Clodius were having an affair, and while Caesar asserted that this was not the case and no substantial evidence arose suggesting otherwise, he nevertheless divorced, with this quotation as explanation.
quibuscum(que) viis	(and) by whatever ways possible	Used by Honoré de Balzac in several works, including Illusions perdues and Splendeurs et misères des courtisanes.
quid agis	What are you doing?	What's happening? What's going on? What's the news? What's up?
quid est veritas	What is truth?	In the Vulgate translation of John 18:38, Pilate's question to Jesus (Greek: Τί ἐστιν ἀλήθεια;). A possible answer is an anagram of the phrase: est vir qui adest, "it is the man who is here."
quid novi ex Africa	What of the new out of Africa?	less literally, "What's new from Africa?"; derived from an Aristotle quotation
quid nunc	What now?	Commonly shortened to quidnunc. As a noun, a quidnunc is a busybody or a gossip. Patrick Campbell worked for The Irish Times under the pseudonym "Quidnunc".
quid sit quidditas quidditatis	What is the quiddity of quiddity?	A philosophical question also raised, in the context of German legal theory, by Wilhelm Scheuerle in his classic 1963 essay Vom Wesen des Wesens: Studien über das sogenannte Wesensargument im juristischen Begründen.
quid pro quo	what for what	Commonly used in English, it is also translated as "this for that" or "a thing for a thing". Signifies a favor exchanged for a favor. The traditional Latin expression for this meaning was do ut des ("I give, so that you may give").
quid pro tanto retribuamus	What shall we give back in return for so much?	Exhortation regarding civic duty, cultural inheritance, and the responsibility of the living to honor the sacrifices of the past. Generalised from Quid retribuam Domino pro omnibus quae retribuit mihi? ("What shall I render to the Lord for all His benefits toward me?") from Psalm 116:12.
Quid rides? Mutato nomine de te fabula narratur.	Why do you laugh? Change but the name, and the story is told of yourself.	Horace, Satires, I. 1. 69.
quidquid Latine dictum sit altum videtur	whatever has been said in Latin seems deep	Or "anything said in Latin sounds profound". A recent ironic Latin phrase to poke fun at people who seem to use Latin phrases and quotations only to make themselves sound more important or "educated". Similar to the less common omnia dicta fortiora si dicta Latina.
Quidquid non agnoscit glossa, non agnoscit curia	Whatever the Glossa does not recognize, the court does not recognize.	
quieta non movere	don't move settled things	
quilibet potest renunciare juri pro se inducto	anyone may renounce a law introduced for their own benefit	Used in classical law to differentiate law imposed by the state for the benefit of a person in general, but by the state on behalf of them, and one imposed specifically that that person ought to have a say in whether the law is implemented.
Quis custodiet ipsos custodes?	Who will guard the guards themselves?	Commonly associated with Plato who in the Republic poses this question; and from Juvenal's On Women, referring to the practice of having eunuchs guard women and beginning with the word sed ("but"). Usually translated less literally, as "Who watches the watchmen (or modern, 'watchers')?" This translation is a common epigraph, such as of the Tower Commission and Alan Moore's Watchmen comic book series.
quis leget haec?	Who will read this?	
quis, quid, ubi, quibus auxiliis, cur, quomodo, quando?	Who, what, where, by what means, why, how, when?	Compare the Five Ws. From Thomas Aquinas's Summa Theologica, but ancient authors provide other similar lists.
quis separabit?	Who will separate us?	motto of Northern Ireland and of the Order of St Patrick
quis ut Deus	Who [is] as God?	Usually translated "Who is like unto God?" Questions who would have the audacity to compare himself to a Supreme Being. It is a translation of the Hebrew name 'Michael' = Mi cha El Who like God מי/כ/ אל Hebrew: מִיכָאֵל (right to left).
quo errat demonstrator	where the prover errs	A pun on "quod erat demonstrandum"
quo fata ferunt	where the fates bear us to	motto of Bermuda
quo non ascendam	to what heights can I not rise?	motto of Army Burn Hall College
quod verum tutum	what is true is right	motto of Spier's School
Quo Vadimus?	Where are we going?	Title of the series finale of Aaron Sorkin's TV dramedy Sports Night
quo vadis?	Where are you going?	According to Vulgate translation of John 13:36, Saint Peter asked Jesus Domine, quo vadis? ("Lord, where are you going?"). The King James Version has the translation "Lord, whither goest thou?"
Quo warranto	by what warrant?	Medieval Latin title for a prerogative writ by which a court requires some person or entity to prove the source of some authority it is exercising. Used for various purposes in different jurisdictions.
quocunque jeceris stabit	whithersoever you throw it, it will stand	motto of the Isle of Man
quod abundat non obstat	what is abundant doesn't hinder	It is no problem to have too much of something.
quod cito fit, cito perit	what is done quickly, perishes quickly	Things done in a hurry are more likely to fail and fail quicker than those done with care.
quod erat demonstrandum (Q.E.D.)	what was to be demonstrated	The abbreviation is often written at the bottom of a mathematical proof. Sometimes translated loosely into English as "The Five Ws", W.W.W.W.W., which stands for "Which Was What We Wanted".
quod erat faciendum (Q.E.F.)	which was to be done	Or "which was to be constructed". Used in translations of Euclid's Elements when there was nothing to prove, but there was something being constructed, for example a triangle with the same size as a given line.
quod est (q.e.)	which is	
quod est necessarium est licitum	what is necessary is lawful	
quod gratis asseritur, gratis negatur	what is asserted without reason may be denied without reason	If no grounds have been given for an assertion, then there are no grounds needed to reject it.
quod licet Iovi, non licet bovi	what is permitted to Jupiter is not permitted to an ox	If an important person does something, it does not necessarily mean that everyone can do it (cf. double standard). Iovi (also commonly rendered Jovi) is the dative form of Iuppiter ("Jupiter" or "Jove"), the chief god of the Romans.
quod me nutrit me destruit	what nourishes me destroys me	Cf. § quod sapit nutrit. Thought to have originated with Elizabethan playwright Christopher Marlowe. Generally interpreted to mean that that which motivates or drives a person can consume him or her from within. This phrase has become a popular slogan or motto for pro-ana websites, anorexics and bulimics.
quod natura non dat Salmantica non praestat	what nature does not give, Salamanca does not provide	Refers to the Spanish University of Salamanca, meaning that education cannot substitute the lack of brains.
quod non fecerunt barbari, fecerunt Barberini	What the barbarians did not do, the Barberinis did	A well-known satirical lampoon left attached to the ancient "speaking" statue of Pasquino on a corner of the Piazza Navona in Rome, Italy. Through a sharp pun the writer criticizes Pope Urban VIII, of the Barberini family, who reused stones and decorations from ancient buildings to build new ones, thus wrecking classical constructions that even the barbarians had not touched.
quod periit, periit	What is gone is gone	What has happened has happened and it cannot be changed, thus we should look forward into the future instead of being pulled by the past.
quod sapit nutrit	what tastes good nourishes	Ancient saying, promoted by Galen; cf. § quod me nutrit me destruit
quod scripsi, scripsi	What I have written I have written.	Pilate to the chief priests (John 19:22)
quod supplantandum, prius bene sciendum	Whatever is to be supplanted, [must] first be understood	A caution against following a doctrine of Naive Analogy when attempting to formulate a scientific hypothesis.
quod vide (q.v.)	which see	Used after a term, phrase, or topic that should be looked up elsewhere in the current document, book, etc. For more than one term or phrase, the plural is quae vide (qq.v.).
quodcumque dixerit vobis, facite	Whatever He tells you, that you shall do.	More colloquially: "Do whatever He [Jesus] tells you to do." Instructions of Mary to the servants at the Wedding at Cana. (John 2:5). Also the motto of East Catholic High School.
quomodo vales	How are you?	Mainly in Neo-Latin, but also in John Jortin (1758), The Life of Erasmus, vol. 1, p. 196
quorum	of whom	the number of members whose presence is required under the rules to make any given meeting constitutional
quorum pars minima fui	of whom I was a small part	Attributed to notorious spy Kim Philby discussing his contribution to the status of Allen Dulles as a legendary clandestine officer
quos amor verus tenuit tenebit	Those whom true love has held, it will go on holding	from Thyestes, Seneca the Younger
quot capita, tot sensus	as many heads, so many perceptions	"There are as many opinions as there are heads" – Terence
quot homines tot sententiae	as many men, so many opinions	Or "there are as many opinions as there are people", "how many people, so many opinions"
quousque tandem?	For how much longer?	From Cicero's first speech In Catilinam to the Roman Senate regarding the conspiracy of Catiline: Quo usque tandem abutere, Catilina, patientia nostra? ("For how much longer, Catiline, will you abuse our patience?"). Besides being a well-known line in itself, it was often used as a text sample in printing (cf. lorem ipsum). See also O tempora, o mores! (from the same speech).

== R ==
Latin	Translation	Notes
radix malorum est cupiditas	the root of evils is desire	Or "greed is the root of all evil". Theme of "The Pardoner's Tale" from The Canterbury Tales.
rara avis (rarissima avis)	rare bird (very rare bird)	An extraordinary or unusual thing. From Juvenal's Satires VI: rara avis in terris nigroque simillima cygno ("a rare bird in the lands, and very like a black swan").
rari nantes in gurgite vasto	Rare survivors in the immense sea	Virgil, Aeneid, I, 118
ratio decidendi	reasoning for the decision	The legal, moral, political, and social principles used by a court to compose a judgment's rationale.
ratio legis	reasoning of law	A law's foundation or basis.
ratione personae	by reason of his/her person	Also "jurisdiction ratione personae" the personal reach of the courts jurisdiction.
ratione soli	by account of the ground	Or "according to the soil". Assigning property rights to a thing based on its presence on a landowner's property.
ratum et consummatum	confirmed and completed	in Canon law, a consummated marriage
ratum tantum	confirmed only	in Canon law, a confirmed but unconsummated marriage (which can be dissolved super rato)
re	[in] the matter of	More literally, "by the thing". From the ablative of res ("thing" or "circumstance"). It is a common misconception that the "Re:" in correspondence is an abbreviation for regarding or reply; this is not the case for traditional letters. However, when used in an e-mail subject, there is evidence that it functions as an abbreviation of regarding rather than the Latin word for thing. The use of Latin re, in the sense of "about", "concerning", is English usage.
rebus sic stantibus	with matters standing thus	The doctrine that treaty obligations hold only as long as the fundamental conditions and expectations that existed at the time of their creation hold.
recte et fortiter	Upright and Strong	Motto of Homebush Boys High School
recte et fideliter	Upright and Faithful	Also "just and faithful" and "accurately and faithfully". Motto of Ruyton Girls' School
redde rationem	to give an account	Taken from the Gospel of Luke 16:2.
reductio ad absurdum	leading back to the absurd	A common debate technique, and a method of proof in mathematics and philosophy, that proves the thesis by showing that its opposite is absurd or logically untenable. In general usage outside mathematics and philosophy, a reductio ad absurdum is a tactic in which the logic of an argument is challenged by reducing the concept to its most absurd extreme. Translated from Aristotle's "ἡ εις άτοπον απαγωγη" (hi eis atopon apagogi, "reduction to the impossible").
reductio ad Hitlerum	leading back to Hitler	A term coined by German-American political philosopher Leo Strauss to humorously describe a fallacious argument that compares an opponent's views to those held by Adolf Hitler or the Nazi Party. Derived from reductio ad absurdum.
reductio ad infinitum	leading back to the infinite	An argument that creates an infinite series of causes that does not seem to have a beginning. As a fallacy, it rests upon Aristotle's notion that all things must have a cause, but that all series of causes must have a sufficient cause, that is, an unmoved mover. An argument which does not seem to have such a beginning becomes difficult to imagine. If it can be established, separately, that the chain must have a start, then a reductio ad infinitum is a valid refutation technique.
reformatio in peius	change to worse	A decision from a court of appeal is amended to a worse one. With certain exceptions, this is prohibited at the Boards of Appeal of the European Patent Office by case law.
regem ego comitem me comes regem	you made me a Count, I will make you a King	Motto of the Forbin family
reginam occidere	to kill the queen	Written by John, archbishop of Esztergom, to Hungarian nobles planning the assassination of Gertrude of Merania. The full sentence, Reginam occidere nolite timere bonum est si omnes consentiunt ego non contradico, has two contradictory meanings depending on how it is punctuated: either Reginam occidere nolite timere; bonum est; si omnes consentiunt, ego non contradico (do not fear to kill the queen, it is right; if everyone agrees, I do not oppose it) or Reginam occidere nolite; timere bonum est; si omnes consentiunt, ego non; contradico (do not kill the queen; it is good to fear [doing so]; [even] if everyone agrees, I do not; I oppose it). The queen was assassinated as the plotters saw the bishop's message as an encouragement.
regnat populus	the people rule	State motto of Arkansas, adopted in 1907. Originally rendered in 1864 in the plural, regnant populi ("the peoples rule"), but subsequently changed to the singular.
regnet christus	Christ reigns	motto of Our Lady of the Sacred Heart College, Sydney
regnum juris regnum pacis	rule of law, rule of peace	Motto of the Henry N.R. Jackman Faculty of Law at the University of Toronto
Regnum Mariae Patrona Hungariae	Kingdom of Mary, the Patron of Hungary	Former motto of Hungary
regressus ad uterum	return to the womb	Concept used in psychoanalysis by Sándor Ferenczi and the Budapest School
rem acu tetigisti	You have touched the point with a needle	i.e., "You have hit the nail on the head"
rem tene, verba sequentur	Understand the matter, the words will follow	That is, know the contents of your argument, what you intend to say, and then the way to say it, the precise words, will come easily.
Renovatio imperii Romanorum	Renewal of the empire of the Romans	A phrase declaring an intention to restore the Roman Empire.
renovatio urbis	urban renewal	a period of city planning and architectural updating in Renaissance Italy, i.e. the vast architectural programme begun under Doge Andrea Gritti in Venice
repetita iuvant	repeating does good	Lit: "Repeated things help". Usually said as a jocular remark to defend the speaker's (or writer's) choice to repeat some important piece of information to ensure reception by the audience.
repetitio est mater studiorum	repetition is the mother of study/learning	
requiem aeternam dona ei(s), Domine	give him/her (them) eternal rest, O Lord	From the Christian prayer Eternal Rest, said for the dead. Source of the term requiem, meaning the Mass for the Dead or a musical setting thereof.
requiescat in pace (R.I.P.)	let him/her rest in peace	Or "may he/she rest in peace". A benediction for the dead. Often inscribed on tombstones or other grave markers. "RIP" is commonly reinterpreted as meaning the English phrase "Rest In Peace", the two meaning essentially the same thing.
rerum cognoscere causas	to learn the causes of things	Motto of the University of Sheffield, the University of Guelph, and London School of Economics.
res derelictae	abandoned thing	Voluntarily abandoned property; a form of res nullius that can thereby be acquired principally through occupatio, or by other means in their specific contexts.
res firma mitescere nescit	a firm resolve does not know how to weaken	Used in the 1985 film American Flyers where it is colloquially translated as "once you got it up, keep it up".
res gestae	things done	A phrase used in law representing the belief that certain statements are made naturally, spontaneously and without deliberation during the course of an event, they leave little room for misunderstanding/misinterpretation upon hearing by someone else (i.e. by the witness who will later repeat the statement to the court). As a result, the courts believe that such statements carry a high degree of credibility, and may admit them as an exception to the rule against hearsay.
res ipsa loquitur	the thing speaks for itself	A phrase from the common law of torts meaning that negligence can be inferred from the fact that such an accident happened, without proof of exactly how.
res judicata	judged thing	A matter which has been decided by a court. Often refers to the legal concept that once a matter has been finally decided by the courts, it cannot be litigated again (cf. non bis in idem and double jeopardy).
res, non verba	"actions speak louder than words", or "deeds, not words"	From rēs ("things, facts") the plural of rēs ("a thing, a fact") + nōn ("not") + verba ("words") the plural of verbum ("a word"). Literally meaning "things, not words" or "facts instead of words" but referring to that "actions be used instead of words".
res nullius	nobody's property	Goods without an owner. Used for things or beings which belong to nobody and are up for grabs, e.g., uninhabited and uncolonized lands, wandering wild animals, etc. (cf. terra nullius, "no man's land").
res publica	Pertaining to the state or public	source of the word republic
respice adspice prospice	look behind, look here, look ahead	i.e., "examine the past, the present and future". Motto of CCNY.
respice finem	look back at the end	i.e., "have regard for the end" or "consider the end"; part of the dactylic hexameter quidquid agis prudenter agas et respice finem (whatever you do, do it wisely and consider the end) from Gesta Romanorum. Generally a memento mori, a warning to remember one's death. Motto of Homerton College, Cambridge, Trinity College, Kandy, Georgetown College in Kentucky, Turnbull High School, Glasgow, and the London Oratory School.
respondeat superior	let the superior respond	Regarded as a legal maxim in agency law, referring to the legal liability of the principal with respect to an employee. Whereas a hired independent contractor acting tortiously may not cause the principal to be legally liable, a hired employee acting tortiously will cause the principal (the employer) to be legally liable, even if the employer did nothing wrong.
restitutio ad (or in) integrum	restoration to original condition	Principle behind the awarding of damages in common law negligence claims
Restitutor Orbis	Restorer of the world	A title given to Roman Emperor Aurelian after reuniting the Roman Empire in the Crisis of the Third Century.
resurgam	I shall arise	"I shall rise again", expressing Christian faith in resurrection at the Last Day. It appears, among other things, in Charlotte Brontë's Jane Eyre, as the epitaph written on Helen Burns's grave; in a poem of Emily Dickinson: Poems (1955) I. 56 (" 'Arcturus' is his other name"), I slew a worm the other day – A 'Savant' passing by Murmured 'Resurgam' – 'Centipede'! 'Oh Lord – how frail are we'!; and in a letter of Vincent van Gogh. The OED gives "1662 J. Trapp, Annotations upon the Old and New Testament, in five distinct volumes (London, 1662), vol. I, p. 142: "Howbeit he had hope in his death, and might write Resurgam on his grave" as its earliest attribution in the English corpus.
retine vim istam, falsa enim dicam, si coges	Restrain your strength, for if you compel me I will tell lies	An utterance by the Delphic oracle recorded by Eusebius in Praeparatio evangelica, book VI, ch. 5, translated from the Greek of Porphyry (cf. E. H. Gifford's translation) and used by William Wordsworth as a subtitle for his ballad "Anecdote for Fathers".
rex regum fidelum et	king even of faithful kings	Latin motto that appears on the crest of the Trinity Broadcasting Network of Paul and Jan Crouch.
rigor mortis	stiffness of death	The rigidity of corpses when chemical reactions cause the limbs to stiffen about 3–4 hours after death. Other signs of death include drop in body temperature (algor mortis, "cold of death") and discoloration (livor mortis, "bluish color of death").
risum teneatis, amici?	Can you help laughing, friends?	An ironic or rueful commentary, appended following a fanciful or unbelievable tale.
risus abundat in ore stultorum	laughter is abundant in the mouth of fools	excessive and inappropriate laughter signifies stupidity.
Roma invicta	Unconquered Rome	Inspirational motto inscribed on the Statue of Rome.
Roma locuta, causa finita	Rome has spoken, the case is closed	In Roman Catholic ecclesiology, doctrinal matters are ultimately decided by the Vatican.
Romanes eunt domus	People called Romans they go the house	An intentionally garbled Latin phrase from Monty Python's Life of Brian. Its intended meaning is "Romans, go home!", in Latin Romani ite domum.
rorate coeli	drop down ye heavens	a.k.a. The Advent Prose.
rosam quae meruit ferat	She who has earned the rose may bear it	Motto from Sweet Briar College
rus in urbe	A countryside in the city	Generally used to refer to a haven of peace and quiet within an urban setting, often a garden, but can refer to interior decoration.

== S ==
Latin	Translation	Notes
saltus in demonstrando	leap in explaining	a leap in logic, by which a necessary part of an equation is omitted.
salus in arduis	a stronghold (or refuge) in difficulties	a Roman Silver Age maxim. Also the school motto of Wellingborough School.
salus populi suprema lex esto	the welfare of the people is to be the highest law	From Cicero's De Legibus, book III, part III, sub. VIII. Quoted by John Locke in his Second Treatise, On Civil Government, to describe the proper organization of government. Also the state motto of Missouri.
salva veritate	with truth intact	Refers to two expressions that can be interchanged without changing the truth value of the statements in which they occur.
Salvator Mundi	Savior of the World	Christian epithet, usually referring to Jesus. The title of paintings by Albrecht Dürer and Leonardo da Vinci.
salvo errore et omissione (s.e.e.o.)	save for error and omission	Used as a reservation on statements of financial accounts. Often now given in English "errors and omissions excluded" or "e&oe".
salvo honoris titulo (SHT)	save for title of honor	Addressing oneself to someone whose title is unknown.
Sancta Sedes	Holy Chair	literally, "holy seat". Refers to the Papacy or the Holy See.
sancta simplicitas	holy innocence	Or "sacred simplicity".
sancte et sapienter	in a holy and wise way	Also sancte sapienter (holiness, wisdom), motto of several institutions, notably King's College London
sanctum sanctorum	Holy of Holies	referring to a more sacred and/or guarded place, within a lesser guarded, yet also holy location.
sapere aude	dare to know	From Horace's Epistularum liber primus, Epistle II, line 40. Made popular in Kant's essay Answering the Question: What Is Enlightenment? defining the Age of Enlightenment. The phrase is common usage as a university motto.
sapiens dominabitur astris	the wise man will master the stars	Astrological aphorism and motto of the Ukrainian Main Directorate of Intelligence.
sapiens qui prospicit	wise is he who looks ahead	Motto of Malvern College, England
sapienti sat	enough for the wise	From Plautus. Indicates that something can be understood without any need for explanation, as long as the listener has enough wisdom or common sense. Often extended to dictum sapienti sat est ("enough has been said for the wise", commonly translated as "a word to the wise is enough").
sapientia et doctrina	wisdom and learning	Motto of Fordham University, New York; of Hill House School Doncaster, England
sapientia et eloquentia	wisdom and eloquence	One of the mottos of the Ateneo schools in the Philippines
sapientia et veritas	wisdom and truth	Motto of Christchurch Girls' High School, New Zealand
sapientia et virtus	wisdom and virtue	Motto of the University of Hong Kong, Hong Kong
sapientia ianua vitae	wisdom is the gateway to life	Motto of the Wirral Grammar School for Boys, Bebington, England
sapientia melior auro	wisdom is better than gold	Motto of University of Deusto, Bilbao, San Sebastián, Spain
sapientia, pax, fraternitas	Wisdom, Peace, Fraternity	Motto of Universidad de las Américas, Puebla, Cholula, Mexico
scientia pennae	On Wings of Knowledge	Motto of Mombasa Academy, Mombasa, Kenya
sapientia potentia est	wisdom is power	Motto of the House of Akeleye, Sweden, Denmark, Czechoslovakia
sat celeriter fieri quidquid fiat satis bene	That which has been done well has been done quickly enough	One of the two favorite maxims of Augustus. The other is "festina lente" ("hurry slowly", i. e., if you want to go fast, go slow).
satius est impunitum relinqui facinus nocentis (quam innocentem damnari) (Note: Also as a transcription error latius est)	It is better to let the crime of the guilty go unpunished (than to condemn the innocent)	
scientia ac labore	By/from/with knowledge and labour	Motto of several institutions
scientia aere perennius	knowledge, more lasting than bronze	unknown origin, probably adapted from Horace's ode III (Exegi monumentum aere perennius).
scientia cum religione	religion and knowledge united	Motto of St Vincent's College, Potts Point
scientiae cedit mare	The sea yields to knowledge	Motto of the United States Coast Guard Academy.
scientia dux vitae certissimus	Science is the truest guide in life	Motto of the Middle East Technical University.
Scientiae et patriae	For science and fatherland	Motto of University of Latvia
scientia et labor	knowledge and work	motto of Universidad Nacional de Ingeniería
scientia et sapientia	knowledge and wisdom	motto of Illinois Wesleyan University
scientia imperii decus et tutamen	knowledge is the adornment and protection of the Empire	Motto of Imperial College London
scientia ipsa potentia est	knowledge itself is power	Stated originally by Sir Francis Bacon in Meditationes Sacrae (1597), which in modern times is often paraphrased as scientia est potestas or scientia potentia est (knowledge is power).
scientia, labor, libertas	science, labour, liberty	Motto of the Free University of Tbilisi.
scientia non olet	knowledge doesn't smell	A variation on Emperor Vespasian's pecunia non olet in Suetonius' De vita Caesarum. Used to say the way in which we learn something doesn't matter as long as it is knowledge acquired.
scientia vincere tenebras	conquering darkness by science	Motto of several institutions, such as the Brussels Free Universities (Université Libre de Bruxelles and Vrije Universiteit Brussel).
scilicet (sc. or ss.)	it is permitted to know	that is to say; to wit; namely; in a legal caption, it provides a statement of venue or refers to a location.
scio	I know	
scio me nihil scire	I know that I know nothing	
scire quod sciendum	knowledge which is worth having	motto of now defunct publisher Small, Maynard & Company
scribimus indocti doctique poemata passim	Each desperate blockhead dares to write	as translated by Philip Francis. From Horace, Epistularum liber secundus (1, 117) and quoted in Fielding's Tom Jones; lit: "Learned or not, we shall write poems without distinction."
scuto amoris divini	by the shield of God's love	The motto of Skidmore College
sectamini caritatem	pursue love	From 1 Corinthians 14:1, motto of the Roman Catholic Diocese of Motherwell
seculo seculorum	forever and ever	
secundum quid et simpliciter	[what is true] according to something, [is true] absolutely	"unqualified generalization" in Aristotle's Sophistical Refutations
sed ipse spiritus postulat pro nobis, gemitibus inenarrabilibus	But the same Spirit intercedes incessantly for us, with inexpressible groans	Romans 8:26
sed terrae graviora manent	But on earth, worse things await	Virgil, Aeneid 6:84.
sede vacante	with the seat being vacant	The "seat" refers to the Holy See; the vacancy refers to the interregnum between two popes.
sedes apostolica	apostolic chair	Synonymous with Sancta Sedes.
sedes incertae	seat (i.e. location) uncertain	Used in biological classification to indicate that there is no agreement as to which higher order grouping a taxon should be placed into. Abbreviated sed. incert.
sedet, aeternumque sedebit	sit, be seated forever	from Virgil's Aeneid 6:617: when you stop trying, then you lose
semel in anno licet insanire	once in a year one is allowed to go crazy	Concept expressed by various authors, such as Seneca, Saint Augustine and Horace. It became proverbial during the Middle Ages.
semper ad meliora	always towards better things	Motto of several institutions
semper anticus	always forward	Motto of the 45th Infantry Division (United States) and its successor, the 45th Infantry Brigade Combat Team (United States)
semper apertus	always open	Motto of University of Heidelberg
semper ardens	always burning	Motto of Carl Jacobsen and name of a line of beers by Danish brewery Carlsberg.
semper eadem	ever the same	personal motto of Elizabeth I, appears above her royal coat of arms. Used as motto of Elizabeth College, Guernsey, Channel Islands, which was founded by Elizabeth I, and of Ipswich School, to whom Elizabeth granted a royal charter. Also the motto of the City of Leicester and Prince George's County.
semper excelsius	always higher	Motto of the K.A.V. Lovania Leuven and the House of Wrigley-Pimley-McKerr
semper fidelis	always faithful	Motto of several institutions, e.g. United States Marine Corps
semper fortis	always brave	Unofficial motto of the United States Navy
semper idem	always the same	Motto of Underberg
semper in excretia sumus solim profundum variat	We're always in the manure; only the depth varies.	Lord de Ramsey, House of Lords, 21 January 1998
semper instans	always threatening	Motto of 846 NAS Royal Navy
semper invicta	always invincible	Motto of Warsaw
semper liber	always free	Motto of the city of Victoria, British Columbia
semper libertas	always freedom	Motto of Prince George County, Virginia
semper maior	always more, always greater	Motto of Ignatius of Loyola, founder of the Jesuits (Society of Jesus)
semper necessitas probandi incumbit ei qui agit	the necessity of proof always lies with the person who lays charges	Latin maxim often associated with the burden of proof in law or in philosophy
semper paratus	always prepared	Motto of several institutions, e.g. United States Coast Guard; see also nunquam non paratus (never unprepared)
semper primus	always first	Motto of several US military units
semper progrediens	always progressing	Motto of the island of Sint Maarten, of King City Secondary School in King City, Ontario, Canada and of Fairfax High School (Fairfax, Virginia)
semper reformanda	always in need of being reformed	A phrase deriving from the Nadere Reformatie movement in the seventeenth century Dutch Reformed Church and widely but informally used in Reformed and Presbyterian churches today. It refers to the conviction of certain Reformed Protestant theologians that the church must continually re-examine itself in order to maintain its purity of doctrine and practice. The term first appeared in print in Jodocus van Lodenstein, Beschouwinge van Zion (Contemplation of Zion), Amsterdam, 1674.
semper supra	always above	Motto of the United States Space Force
semper sursum	always aim high	Motto of several institutions
semper vigilans	always vigilant	Motto of several institutions including the Civil Air Patrol of the United States Air Force, the city of San Diego, California
semper vigilo	always vigilant	Motto of the Scottish Police Forces, Scotland
Senatus Populusque Romanus (SPQR)	The Senate and the People of Rome	The official name of the Roman Republic. "SPQR" was carried on battle standards by the Roman legions. In addition to being an ancient Roman motto, it remains the motto of the modern city of Rome.
sensu lato	with the broad, or general, meaning	Less literally, "in the wide sense".
sensu stricto cf. stricto sensu	"with the tight meaning"	Less literally, "in the strict sense".
sensus plenior	in the fuller meaning	In biblical exegesis, the deeper meaning intended by God, not intended by the human author.
sequere pecuniam	follow the money	In an effort to understand why things may be happening contrary to expectations, or even in alignment with them, this idiom suggests that keeping track of where money is going may show the basis for the observed behavior. Similar in spirit to the phrase cui bono (who gains?) or cui prodest (who advances?), but outside those phrases' historically legal context.
Sermo Tuus Veritas Est	Thy Word Is Truth	motto of the General Theological Seminary, Cornelius Fontem Esua
sero venientes male sedentes	those who are late are poorly seated	
sero venientibus ossa	those who are late get bones	
servabo fidem	Keeper of the faith	I will keep the faith.
serviam	I will serve	The answer of St. Michael the Archangel to the non serviam, "I will not serve" of Satan, when the angels were tested by God on whether they will serve an inferior being, a man, Jesus, as their Lord.
servus servorum Dei	servant of the servants of God	A title for the Pope.
sesquipedalia verba	words a foot and a half long	From Horace's Ars Poetica, "proicit ampullas et sesquipedalia verba" ("he throws down his high-flown language and his foot-and-a-half-long words"). A self-referential jab at long words and needlessly elaborate language in general.
Si comprehendis [,] non est Deus	if you understand [something], it is not God	Augustine of Hippo, Sermo 117.3.5; PL 38, 663
si dormiam capiar	If I sleep, I may be caught	Motto of HMS Wakeful (H88)
Si monumentum requiris circumspice	If you seek (his) monument, look around you	from the epitaph on Christopher Wren's tomb in St Paul's Cathedral.
Si non oscillas, noli tintinnare	If you can't swing, don't ring	Inscribed on a plaque above the front door of the Playboy mansion in Chicago.
si omnes... ego non	if all ones... not I	
si peccasse negamus fallimur et nulla est in nobis veritas	if we deny having made a mistake, we are deceived, and there's no truth in us	From Christopher Marlowe's The Tragical History of Doctor Faustus, where the phrase is translated "if we say that we have no sin, we deceive ourselves, and there's no truth in us." (cf. 1 John 1:8 in the New Testament)
si quaeris peninsulam amoenam circumspice	if you seek a delightful peninsula, look around	Said to have been based on the tribute to architect Christopher Wren in St Paul's Cathedral, London: si monumentum requiris, circumspice (see above). State motto of Michigan, adopted in 1835; the spelling of 'peninsulam' is used in the motto, although the correct ancient spelling is 'paeninsulam'.
si quid novisti rectius istis, candidus imperti; si nil, his utere mecum.	if you can better these principles, tell me; if not, join me in following them	Horace, Epistles I :6, 67–68
si tacuisses, philosophus mansisses	If you had kept your silence, you would have stayed a philosopher	This quote is often attributed to the Latin philosopher Boethius of the late fifth and early sixth centuries. It translates literally as, "If you had been silent, you would have remained a philosopher." The phrase illustrates a common use of the subjunctive verb mood.
si vales valeo (SVV)	if you are well, I am well (abbr)	A common beginning for ancient Roman letters. An abbreviation of si vales bene est ego valeo, alternatively written as SVBEEV. The practice fell out of fashion and into obscurity with the decline in Latin literacy.
si vis amari ama	If you want to be loved, love	This is often attributed to the Roman philosopher Seneca, found in the sixth of his letters to Lucilius.
si vis pacem, para bellum	if you want peace, prepare for war	From Publius Flavius Vegetius Renatus, De Re Militari. Origin of the name parabellum for some ammunition and firearms, such as the Luger Parabellum. (Similar to igitur qui desiderat pacem, praeparet bellum and in pace ut sapiens aptarit idonea bello.)
sic	thus	Or "just so". States that the preceding quoted material appears exactly that way in the source, despite any errors of spelling, grammar, usage, or fact that may be present. Used only for previous quoted text; ita or similar must be used to mean "thus" when referring to something about to be stated.
sic currite ut comprehendatis	Run to win	More specifically, So run, that ye may obtain, 1 Corinthians 24. Motto of Divine Word University, Madang, Papua New Guinea.
sic et non	thus and not	More simply, "yes and no".
sic gorgiamus allos subjectatos nunc	we gladly feast on those who would subdue us	Mock-Latin motto of The Addams Family.
sic infit	so it begins	
sic itur ad astra	thus you shall go to the stars	From Virgil, Aeneid book IX, line 641. Possibly the source of the ad astra phrases. Motto of several institutions, including the Royal Canadian Air Force.
sic parvis magna	greatness from small beginnings	Motto of Sir Francis Drake
sic passim	Thus here and there	Used when referencing books; see passim.
sic semper erat, et sic semper erit	Thus has it always been, and thus shall it ever be	
sic semper tyrannis	thus always to tyrants	Attributed to Brutus at the time of Julius Caesar's assassination and to John Wilkes Booth at the time of Abraham Lincoln's assassination; whether it was actually said at either of these events is disputed. State motto of Virginia, adopted in 1776.
sic transit gloria mundi	thus passes the glory of the world	A reminder that all things are fleeting. During Papal coronations, a monk reminds the Pope of his mortality by saying this phrase, preceded by pater sancte ("holy father") while holding before his eyes a burning paper illustrating the passing nature of earthly glories. This is similar to the tradition of a slave in a Roman triumphs whispering memento mori in the ear of the celebrant.
sic utere tuo ut alienum non laedas	use [what is] yours so as not to harm [what is] of others	Or "use your property in such a way that you do not damage others'". A legal maxim related to property ownership laws, often shortened to simply sic utere ("use it thus").
sic vita est	thus is life	Or "such is life". Indicates that a circumstance, whether good or bad, is an inherent aspect of living.
sic vos non vobis mellificates apes	Thus you not for yourselves make honey, bees.	Part of a verse written by Virgil after the poet Bathyllus plagiarized his work.
sidere mens eadem mutato	Though the constellations change, the mind is universal	Latin motto of the University of Sydney.
signetur (sig or S/)	let it be labeled	Medical shorthand
signum fidei	Sign of the Faith	Motto of the Institute of the Brothers of the Christian Schools.
silentium est aureum	silence is golden	Latinization of the English expression "silence is golden". Also Latinized as silentium est aurum ("silence is gold").
similia similibus curantur similia similibus curentur	similar things are taken care of by similar things let similar things be taken care of by similar things	"like is cured by like" and "let like be cured by like"; the first form ("curantur") is indicative, while the second form ("curentur") is subjunctive. The indicative form is found in Paracelsus (16th century), while the subjunctive form is said by Samuel Hahnemann, founder of homeopathy, and is known as the law of similars.
similia similibus solvuntur	similar substances will dissolve similar substances	Used as a general rule in chemistry; "like dissolves like" refers to the ability of polar or non polar solvents to dissolve polar or non polar solutes respectively.
simplex sigillum veri	simplicity is the sign of truth	expresses a sentiment akin to Keep It Simple, Stupid
sincere et constanter	sincere and constant	Motto of the Order of the Red Eagle
sine anno (s.a.)	without a year	Used in bibliographies to indicate that the date of publication of a document is unknown.
sine die	without a day	Originally from old common law texts, where it indicates that a final, dispositive order has been made in the case. In modern legal context, it means there is nothing left for the court to do, so no date for further proceedings is set, resulting in an "adjournment sine die".
Sine Cerere et Baccho friget Venus	without Ceres and Bacchus, Venus remains cold	without food and (alcoholic) drink, love will not ensue; from Terence's comedy Eunuchus (161 BC)
sine ira et studio	without anger and fondness	Thus, impartially. From Tacitus, Annals 1.1.
sine honoris titulo	without honorary title	Addressing oneself to someone whose title is unknown.
sine labore non erit panis in ore	without labour there will be no bread in mouth	
sine loco (s.l.)	without a place	Used in bibliographies to indicate that the place of publication of a document is unknown.
sine metu	"without fear"	Motto of Jameson Irish Whiskey
sine nomine (s.n.)	"without a name"	Used in bibliographies to indicate that the publisher of a document is unknown.
sine poena nulla lex	Without penalty, there is no law	Refers to the ineffectiveness of a law without the means of enforcement
sine prole	Without offspring	Frequently abbreviated to "s.p." or "d.s.p." (decessit sine prole – "died without offspring") in genealogical works.
sine prole superstite	Without surviving children	Without surviving offspring (even in abstract terms)
sine timore aut favore	Without Fear or Favor	St.George's School, Vancouver, British Columbia, Canada motto
sine qua non	without which not	Used to denote something that is an essential part of the whole. See also condicio sine qua non.
sine remediis medicina debilis est	without remedies medicine is powerless	Inscription on a stained glass in the conference hall of a pharmaceutical mill in Kaunas, Lithuania.
sine scientia ars nihil est	without knowledge, skill is nothing	Motto of The International Diving Society and of the Oxford Medical Students' Society.
sisto activitatem	I cease the activity	Phrase, used to cease the activities of the Sejm upon the liberum veto principle
sit nomen Domini benedictum	blessed be the name of the Lord	Phrase used in a pontifical blessing imparted by a Catholic bishop
sit nomine digna	may it be worthy of the name	National motto of Rhodesia, also motto of Durbanville, South Africa
sit pax in valle tamesis	Let there be peace in the Thames Valley	Motto of Thames Valley Police, English territorial police force for Berkshire, Buckinghamshire and Oxfordshire.
sit sine labe decus	let honour stainless be	Motto of the Brisbane Boys' College (Brisbane, Australia).
sit tibi terra levis	may the earth be light to you	Commonly used on gravestones, often contracted as S.T.T.L., the same way as today's R.I.P.
sit venia verbo	may there be forgiveness for the word	Similar to the English idiom "pardon my French".
Socratici viri	"Socrates' men" or "Disciples of Socrates"	Coined by Cicero to refer to any who owe philosophical reasoning and method to Socrates.
sol iustitiae illustra nos	sun of justice, shine upon us	Motto of Utrecht University.
sol lucet omnibus	the sun shines on everyone	Petronius, Satyricon Lybri 100.
sol omnia regit	the sun rules over everything	Inscription near the entrance to Frombork Museum
sola fide	by faith alone	The material principle of the Protestant Reformation and one of the five solas, referring to the Protestant claim that the Bible teaches that men are saved by faith even without works.
sola dosis facit venenum	the dose makes the poison	It is credited to Paracelsus who expressed the classic toxicology maxim "All things are poison and nothing is without poison; only the dose makes a thing not a poison."
sola gratia	by grace alone	A motto of the Protestant Reformation and one of the five solas, referring to the Protestant claim that salvation is an unearned gift (cf. ex gratia), not a direct result of merit.
sola lingua bona est lingua mortua	the only good language is a dead language	Example of dog Latin humor.
sola scriptura	by scripture alone	The formal principle of the Protestant Reformation and one of the five solas, referring to the Protestant idea that the Bible alone is the ultimate authority, not the Pope or tradition.
sola nobilitat virtus	virtue alone ennobles	Similar to virtus sola nobilitas
solamen miseris socios habuisse doloris	misery loves company	From Christopher Marlowe's The Tragical History of Doctor Faustus.
soli Deo gloria (S.D.G.)	glory to God alone	A motto of the Protestant Reformation and one of the five solas, referring to the idea that God is the creator of all good things and deserves all the praise for them. Johann Sebastian Bach often signed his manuscripts with the abbreviation S.D.G. to invoke this phrase, as well as with AMDG (ad maiorem Dei gloriam). The motto of the MasterWorks Festival, an annual Christian performing arts festival.
solus Christus	Christ alone	A motto of the Protestant Reformation and one of the five solas, referring to the Protestant claim that the Bible teaches that Jesus is the only mediator between God and mankind. Also rendered solo Christo ("by Christ alone").
solus ipse	I alone	
solvitur ambulando	it is solved by walking	The problem is solved by taking a walk, or by simple experiment.
sortes biblicae	biblical lots	method of divination where by the Bible is opened randomly and the first words which one sees or points to are interpreted as predictive
Spartam nactus es; hanc exorna	your lot is cast in Sparta, be a credit to it	from Euripides's Telephus, Agamemnon to Menelaus.
specialia generalibus derogant	special departs from general	
species nova	new species	Used in biological taxonomy
spectemur agendo	let us be judged by our acts	Motto of Hawthorn Football Club
Speculum Dinae	Diana's Mirror	Lake Nemi as referred to by poets and painters
speculum speculorum	mirror of mirrors	
spem gregis	the hope of the flock	from Virgil's Eclogues
spem reduxit	he has restored hope	Motto of New Brunswick.
spero meliora	I aspire to greater things	Also translated "I expect better" and "I hope for better things."
spes bona	good hope	Motto of University of Cape Town.
spes vincit thronum	hope conquers (overcomes) the throne	Refers to Revelation 3:21, "To him that overcometh will I grant to sit with me in my throne, even as I also overcame, and am set down with my Father in his throne." On the John Winthrop family tombstone, Boston, Massachusetts.
spiritus mundi	spirit of the world	From The Second Coming (poem) by William Butler Yeats. Refers to Yeats' belief that each human mind is linked to a single vast intelligence, and that this intelligence causes certain universal symbols to appear in individual minds. The idea is similar to Carl Jung's concept of the collective unconscious.
spiritus ubi vult spirat	the spirit spreads wherever it wants	Refers to The Gospel of Saint John 3:8, where he mentions how Jesus told Nicodemus "The wind blows wherever it wants, and even though you can hear its noise, you don't know where it comes from or where it goes. The same thing happens to whomever has been born of the Spirit." It is the motto of Cayetano Heredia University
splendor sine occasu	brightness without setting	Loosely "splendour without diminishment" or "magnificence without ruin". Motto of British Columbia and of Boise State University.
stamus contra malo	we stand against by evil	The motto of the Jungle Patrol in The Phantom. The phrase actually violates Latin grammar because of a mistranslation from English, as the preposition contra takes the accusative case. The correct Latin rendering of "we stand against evil" would be "stamus contra malum".
stante pede	with a standing foot	"Immediately".
stare decisis	to stand by the decided things	To uphold previous rulings, recognize precedent.
Stat crux dum volvitur orbis	The Cross is steady while the world turns	Motto of the Carthusian Order.
stat rosa pristina nomine, nomina nuda tenemus	the rose of old remains only in its name; we hold only empty names	An epigraph quoted at the end of Umberto Eco's The Name of the Rose. A verse by Bernard of Cluny (although likely mistranscribed in medieval times from an original stat Roma pristina nomine..., "primordial Rome remains only in its name...").
stat sua cuique dies	There is a day [turn] for everybody	Virgil, Aeneid, X 467
statim (stat)	"immediately"	Medical shorthand used following an urgent request.
statio bene fide carinis	A safe harbour for ships	Motto of Cork City, Ireland. Adapted from Virgil's Aeneid (II, 23: statio male fida carinis, "an unsafe harbour") but corrupted for unknown reasons to "fide".
status aparte	separate state	The special status of Aruba between 1986 and 2010 as a constituent country within the Kingdom of the Netherlands, separate from the Netherlands Antilles to which it belonged until 1986.
status quaestionis	the state of investigation	most commonly employed in scholarly literature to refer in a summary way to the accumulated results, scholarly consensus, and areas remaining to be developed on any given topic.
status quo	the state in which	The current condition or situation.
status quo ante	the state in which [things were] before	"Status quo ante" redirects here. For other uses, see Status Quo Ante (disambiguation). The state of affairs prior to some upsetting event.
status quo ante bellum	the state before the war	A common term in peace treaties.
stet	let it stand	Marginal mark in proofreading to indicate that something previously deleted or marked for deletion should be retained.
stet fortuna domus	let the fortune of the house stand	First part of the motto of Harrow School, England, and inscribed upon Ricketts House, at the California Institute of Technology.
stipendium peccati mors est	the reward of sin is death	From Christopher Marlowe's The Tragical History of Doctor Faustus. (See Rom 6:23, "For the wages of sin is death, but the free gift of God is eternal life in Christ Jesus our Lord.")
strenuis ardua cedunt	the heights yield to endeavour	Motto of the University of Southampton.
stricto sensu cf. sensu stricto	with the tight meaning	Less literally, "in the strict sense".
stupor mundi	the wonder of the world	A title given to Frederick II, Holy Roman Emperor. More literally translated "the bewilderment of the world", or, in its original, pre-Medieval sense, "the stupidity of the world".
sua sponte	by its own accord	Legal term when a court takes up a motion on its own initiative, not because any of the parties to the case has made the motion. The regimental motto of the 75th Ranger Regiment of the U.S. Army.
suaviter in modo, fortiter in re	gently in manner, resolutely in execution	Motto of Essendon Football Club
sub anno	under the year	Commonly abbreviated s.a., it is used to cite events recorded in chronicles according to the year under which they are listed. For example, "ASC MS A, s.a. 855" means the entry for the year 855 in manuscript A of the Anglo-Saxon Chronicle.
sub cruce lumen	The Light Under the Cross	Motto of the University of Adelaide, Australia. Refers to the figurative "light of learning" and the Southern Cross constellation, Crux.
sub divo	under the wide open sky	Also, "under the sky", "in the open air", "out in the open" or "outdoors". Ablative "divo" does not distinguish divus, divi, a god, from divum, divi, the sky.
sub finem	toward the end	Used in citations to refer to the end of a book, page, etc., and abbreviated 's.f.' Used after the page number or title. E.g., 'p. 20 s.f. '
sub Iove frigido	under cold Jupiter	At night; from Horace's Odes 1.1:25
sub judice	under a judge	Said of a case that cannot be publicly discussed until it is finished. Also sub iudice.
sub poena	under penalty	Source of the English noun subpoena. Said of a request, usually by a court, that must be complied with on pain of punishment. Examples include sub poena duces tecum ("take with you under penalty"), a court summons to appear and produce tangible evidence, and sub poena ad testificandum ("under penalty to testify"), a summons to appear and give oral testimony.
sub rosa	under the rose	"In secret", "privately", "confidentially", or "covertly". In the Middle Ages, a rose was suspended from the ceiling of a council chamber to indicate that what was said in the "under the rose" was not to be repeated outside. This practice originates in Greek mythology, where Aphrodite gave a rose to her son Eros, and he, in turn, gave it to Harpocrates, the god of silence, to ensure that his mother's indiscretions—or those of the gods in general, in other accounts—were kept under wraps.
sub nomine (sub nom.)	under the name	"in the name of", "under the title of"; used in legal citations to indicate the name under which the litigation continued.
sub silentio	under silence	implied but not expressly stated.
sub specie aeternitatis	under the sight of eternity	Thus, "from eternity's point of view". From Spinoza, Ethics.
sub specie Dei	under the sight of God	"from God's point of view or perspective".
sub tuum praesidium	Beneath thy compassion	Name of the oldest extant hymn to the Theotokos (Blessed Virgin Mary). Also "under your protection". A popular school motto.
Sub umbra floreo	Under the shade I flourish	National Motto of Belize, referring to the shade of the mahogany tree.
sub verbo; sub voce		Under the word or heading; abbreviated s.v. Used to cite a work, such as a dictionary, with alphabetically arranged entries, e.g. "Oxford English Dictionary, s.v. 'horse.'""
sublimis ab unda	Raised from the waves	Motto of King Edward VII and Queen Mary School, Lytham
subsiste sermonem statim	stop speaking immediately	
Succisa virescit	Cut down, we grow back stronger	Motto of Delbarton School
Sudetia non cantat	One doesn't sing on the Sudeten Mountains	Saying from Hanakia
sui generis	Of its own kind	In a class of its own; of a unique kind. E.g. "The City of London is a sui generis entity, with ancient rights that differ from all other jurisdictions in the United Kingdom."
sui iuris	Of one's own right	Capable of responsibility. Has both legal and ecclesiastical use. Commonly rendered sui juris.
sum quod eris	I am what you will be	A gravestone inscription to remind the reader of the inevitability of death (cf. memento mori). Also rendered fui quod sis ("I have been what you are") and tu fui ego eris ("I have been you, you will be I").
sum quod sum	I am what I am	from Augustine's Sermon No. 76.
summa cum laude	with highest praise	
summa potestas	sum or totality of power	It refers to the final authority of power in government. For example, power of the Sovereign.
summa summarum	all in all	Literally "sum of sums". When a short conclusion is rounded up at the end of some elaboration.
summum bonum	the supreme good	Literally "highest good". Also summum malum ("the supreme evil").
summum ius, summa iniuria	supreme law, supreme injustice	From Cicero (De officiis, I, 10, 33). An acritical application of law, without understanding and respect of laws's purposes and without considering the overall circumstances, is often a means of supreme injustice. A similar sentence appears in Terence (Heautontimorumenos, IV, 5): Ius summum saepe summa est malitia ("supreme justice is often out of supreme malice (or wickedness)").
sumptibus auctoris	published [cost of printing paid] by author	Found in self-published academic books of the 17th to 19th century. Often preceded by Latin name of city in which the work is published.
sunt lacrimae rerum	there are tears for things	From Virgil, Aeneid. Followed by et mentem mortalia tangunt ("and mortal things touch my mind"). Aeneas cries as he sees Carthaginian temple murals depicting the deaths of the Trojan War. See also hinc illae lacrimae.
sunt omnes unum	they are all one	
sunt pueri pueri, pueri puerilia tractant	Children are children, and children do childish things	anonymous proverb
sunt superis sua iura	the gods have their own laws	From Ovid's Metamorphoses, book IX, line 500; also used by David Hume in The Natural History of Religion, chapter XIII
suo jure	in one's own right	Used in the context of titles of nobility, for instance where a wife may hold a title in her own right rather than through her marriage.
suo motu	upon one's own initiative	Also rendered suo moto. Usually used when a court of law, upon its own initiative, (i.e., no petition has been filed) proceeds against a person or authority that it deems has committed an illegal act. It is used chiefly in South Asia.
suos cultores scientia coronat	Knowledge crowns those who seek her	The motto of Syracuse University, New York.
super firmum fundamentum dei	On the firm foundation of God	The motto of Ursinus College, Pennsylvania.
super fornicam	on the lavatory	Where Thomas More accused the reformer, Martin Luther, of going to celebrate Mass.
superbia in proelia	pride in battle	Motto of Manchester City F.C.
superbus via inscientiae	proud of the way of ignorance	Motto of the Alien Research Labs of the fictional Black Mesa Research Facility in the video game Half-Life (1998)
supero omnia	I surpass everything	A declaration that one succeeds above all others.
surdo oppedere	to belch before the deaf	From Erasmus' collection of annotated Adagia (1508): a useless action.
surgam	I shall rise	Motto of Columbia University's Philolexian Society.
sursum corda	Lift up your hearts	Motto of Haileybury College, Hertfordshire. The opening dialogue to the preface of the Eucharistic Prayer or Anaphora in the liturgies of the Christian Church. Hymnal for the German diocese of Paderborn from 1874 to 1975.
sutor, ne ultra crepidam	Cobbler, no further than the sandal!	Thus, don't offer your opinion on things that are outside your competence. It is said that the Greek painter Apelles once asked the advice of a cobbler on how to render the sandals of a soldier he was painting. When the cobbler started offering advice on other parts of the painting, Apelles rebuked him with this phrase in Greek, and it subsequently became a popular Latin expression.
suum cuique tribuere	to render to every man his due	One of Justinian I's three basic precepts of law. Also shortened to suum cuique ("to each his own").
s.v.		Abbreviation for sub verbo or sub voce (see above).

== T ==
Latin	Translation	Notes
tabula gratulatoria	congratulatory tablet	A list of congratulations.
tabula rasa	scraped tablet	Thus, "blank slate". Romans used to write on wax-covered wooden tablets, which were erased by scraping with the flat end of the stylus. John Locke used the term to describe the human mind at birth, before it had acquired any knowledge.
talis qualis	just as such	"Such as it is" or "as such".
taliter qualiter	somewhat	
talium Dei regnum	for of such (little children) is the kingdom of God	from St Mark's gospel 10:14 "talium (parvuli) est enim regnum Dei"; similar in St Matthew's gospel 19:14 "talium est enim regnum caelorum" ("for of such is the kingdom of heaven"); motto of the Cathedral School, Townsville.
tanquam ex ungue leonem	we know the lion by his claw	Said in 1697 by Johann Bernoulli about Isaac Newton's anonymously submitted solution to Bernoulli's challenge regarding the Brachistochrone curve.
tantum nobis creditum	so much has been entrusted to us	Motto of Erindale College in the University of Toronto, Canada.
tantum religio potuit suadere malorum	to such heights of evil are men driven by religion	Lucretius, De rerum natura I.101 Quoted by Christopher Hitchens in ch. 2 of God Is Not Great.
tarde venientibus ossa	To the late are left the bones	
Te occidere possunt sed te edere non possunt nefas est	They can kill you, but they cannot eat you, it is against the law.	The motto of the fictional Enfield Tennis Academy in the David Foster Wallace novel Infinite Jest. Translated in the novel as "They can kill you, but the legalities of eating you are quite a bit dicier".
technica impendi nationi	Technology impulses nations	Motto of Technical University of Madrid
temet nosce	know thyself	A reference to the Greek γνῶθι σεαυτόν (gnothi seauton), inscribed on the pronaos of the Temple of Apollo at Delphi, according to the Greek periegetic writer Pausanias (10.24.1). Rendered also with nosce te ipsum, temet nosce ("thine own self know") appears in The Matrix translated as "know thyself".
tempora heroica	Heroic Age	Literally "Heroic Times"; refers to the period between the mythological Titanomachy and the (relatively) historical Trojan War.
tempora mutantur et nos mutamur in illis	the times are changing, and we change in them	16th century variant of two classical lines of Ovid: tempora labuntur ("time labors", Fasti) and omnia mutantur ("everything changes", Metamorphoses). See entry for details.
tempus edax rerum	time, devourer of all things	Also "time, that devours all things", literally: "time, gluttonous of things", edax: adjectival form of the verb edo to eat. From Ovid, Metamorphoses, 15, 234-236.
tempus fugit	Time flees. Time flies.	From Virgil's Georgics (Book III, line 284), where it appears as fugit inreparabile tempus. A common sundial motto. See also tempus volat, hora fugit below.
tempus rerum imperator	time, commander of all things	"Tempus Rerum Imperator" has been adopted by the Google Web Accelerator project. It is shown in the "About Google Web Accelerator" page. Also, motto of Worshipful Company of Clockmakers.
tempus vernum	spring time	Name of song by popular Irish singer Enya
tempus volat, hora fugit	time flies, the hour flees	
tendit in ardua virtus	virtue strives for what is difficult	Appears in Ovid's Epistulae ex Ponto
teneo te Africa	I hold you, Africa!	Suetonius attributes this to Julius Caesar, from when Caesar was on the African coast.
tentanda via	The way must be tried	motto for York University
ter in die (t.i.d.)	thrice in a day	Medical shorthand for "three times a day".
terminat hora diem; terminat auctor opus.	The hour finishes the day; the author finishes his work.	Phrase concluding Christopher Marlowe's play Doctor Faustus.
terminus ante/post quem	limit before/after which	In archaeology or history, refers to the date before which an artefact or feature must have been deposited. Used with terminus post quem (limit after which). Similarly, terminus ad quem (limit to which) may also refer to the latest possible date of a non-punctual event (period, era, etc.), while terminus a quo (limit from which) may refer to the earliest such date.
terra australis incognita	unknown southern land	First name used to refer to the Australian continent
terra firma	solid earth	Often used to refer to the ground
terra incognita	unknown land	
terra nova	new land	Latin name of Newfoundland (island portion of Canadian province of Newfoundland and Labrador, capital- St. John's), also root of French name of same, Terre-Neuve
terra nullius	land of none	That is, no man's land. A neutral or uninhabited area, or a land not under the sovereignty of any recognized political entity.
terras irradient	let them illuminate the lands	Or "let them give light to the world". An allusion to Isaiah 6.3: plena est omnis terra gloria eius ("the whole earth is full of his glory"). Sometimes mistranslated as "they will illuminate the lands" based on mistaking irradiare for a future indicative third-conjugation verb, whereas it is actually a present subjunctive first-conjugation verb. Motto of Amherst College; the college's original mission was to educate young men to serve God.
tertium non datur	no third (possibility) is given	A logical axiom that a claim is either true or false, with no third option.
tertium quid	a third something	1. Something that cannot be classified into either of two groups considered exhaustive; an intermediate thing or factor. 2. A third person or thing of indeterminate character.
testis unus, testis nullus	one witness is not a witness	A law principle expressing that a single witness is not enough to corroborate a story.
textus receptus	received text	
Tibi cordi immaculato concredimus nos ac consecramus	We consecrate and entrust ourselves to your Immaculate heart (O Mary).	The inscription found on top of the central door of the Minor Basilica of the Immaculate Conception, otherwise known as the Manila Cathedral in the Philippines
timeo Danaos et dona ferentes	I fear Greeks even if they bring gifts	Danaos being a term for the Greeks. In Virgil's Aeneid, II, 49, the phrase is said by Laocoön when warning his fellow Trojans against accepting the Trojan Horse. The full original quote is quidquid id est timeo Danaos et dona ferentis, quidquid id est meaning "whatever it is" and ferentis being an archaic form of ferentes. Commonly mistranslated "Beware of Greeks bearing gifts".
timidi mater non flet	A coward's mother does not weep	A proverb from Cornelius Nepos's Vita of Thrasybulus: praeceptum illud omnium in animis esse debet, nihil in bello oportere contemni, neque sine causa dici matrem timidi flere non solere (that old precept has to be held by all in our minds: nothing should be condemned in war, and it is for a reason that it is said the mother of a coward does not weep [for her cowardly son]).
timor mortis conturbat me	the fear of death confounds me	Refrain originating in the response to the seventh lesson in the Office of the Dead. In the Middle Ages, this service was read each day by clerics. As a refrain, it appears also in other poems and can frequently be found inscribed on tombs.
tolle lege	take up and read	The Conversion of St. Augustine by Fra Angelico In late August of 386, at the age of 31, Augustine of Hippo converted to Christianity. As Augustine later told it, his conversion was prompted by hearing a child's voice say "take up and read" (Latin: tolle, lege). Resorting to the sortes biblicae, he opened a book of St. Paul's writings (Confessiones 8.12.29) at random and read Romans 13:13–14: "Not in rioting and drunkenness, not in chambering and wantonness, not in strife and envying, but put on the Lord Jesus Christ, and make no provision for the flesh to fulfil the lusts thereof."
toto cælo	by whole heaven	as far apart as possible; utterly.
totus tuus	totally yours	Offering one's life in total commitment to another. The motto was adopted by Pope John Paul II to signify his love and servitude to Mary the Mother of Jesus.
traditionis custodes	guardians of tradition	Motu proprio issued by Pope Francis in 2021 regarding the celebration of the Tridentine Mass.
transire benefaciendo	to travel along while doing good	Literally "beneficial passage." Mentioned in "The Seamy Side of History" (L'envers de l'histoire contemporaine, 1848), part of La Comédie humaine, by Honoré de Balzac, and Around the World in Eighty Days by Jules Verne.
translatio imperii	transfer of rule	Used to express the belief in the transfer of imperial authority from the Roman Empire of antiquity to the Medieval Holy Roman Empire.
tres faciunt collegium	three makes company	It takes three to have a valid group; three is the minimum number of members for an organization or a corporation.
treuga Dei	Truce of God	A decree by the medieval Church that all feuds should be cancelled during the Sabbath—effectively from Wednesday or Thursday night until Monday. See also Peace and Truce of God.
tria juncta in uno	Three joined in one	Motto of the Order of the Bath
Triste est omne animal post coitum, præter mulierem gallumque	Every animal is sad after coitus except the human female and the rooster	
tu autem Domine miserere nobis	But Thou, O Lord, have mercy upon us	Phrase said at the end of biblical readings in the liturgy of the medieval church. Also used in brief, "tu autem", as a memento mori epitaph.
tuitio fidei et obsequium pauperum	Defence of the faith and assistance to the poor	Motto of the Association of Canadian Knights of the Sovereign and Military Order of Malta and the Sovereign Military Order of Malta.
tu fui ego eris	I was you; you will be me	Thus, "what you are, I was; what I am, you will be.". A memento mori gravestone inscription to remind the reader that death is unavoidable (cf. sum quod eris).
tu ne cede malis, sed contra audentior ito	you should not give in to evils, but proceed ever more boldly against them	From Virgil, Aeneid, 6, 95. "Ne cede malis" is the motto of The Bronx.
tu quoque	you too	The logical fallacy of attempting to defend one's position merely by pointing out the same weakness in one's opponent.
tu stultus es	you are stupid	Motto for the satirical news organization, The Onion
tuebor	I will protect	Found on the Great Seal on the flag of the state of Michigan.
tunica propior est pallio	A tunic is closer [to the body] than a cloak	From Plautus' Trinummus 1154. Equivalent to "blood is thicker than water" in modern English.
turba	lit. 'uproar', 'disturbance', 'crowd'; in music, specifically in the musical settings of the Passion of Jesus, it refers to any text that is spoken by any group of people, including the disciples, the Jews, or the soldiers.	
turris fortis mihi Deus	God is my strong tower	Motto of Clan Kelly
tutum te robore reddam	I will give you safety by strength	Motto of Clan Crawford
tuum est	It's up to you	Motto of the University of British Columbia

== U ==
Latin	Translation	Notes
uberrima fides	most abundant faith	Or "utmost good faith" (cf. bona fide). A legal maxim of insurance contracts requiring all parties to deal in good faith.
ubertas et fidelitas	fertility and faithfulness	Motto of Tasmania.
ubi amor, ibi dolor	where [there is] love, there [is] pain	
ubi bene, ibi patria	where [it is] well, there [is] the fatherland	Or "Home is where it's good"; see also ubi panis ibi patria.
ubi caritas et amor, Deus ibi est	where there is charity and love, God is there	
ubi dubium, ibi libertas	where [there is] doubt, there [is] freedom	Anonymous proverb.
ubi jus, ibi remedium	Where [there is] a right, there [is] a remedy	
ubi mel, ibi apes	where [there is] honey, there [are] bees	Valuable things are often protected and difficult to obtain.
ubi libertas. ibi patria	where [there is] liberty, there [is] the fatherland	Or "where there is liberty, there is my country". Patriotic motto.
ubi nihil vales, ibi nihil velis	where you are worth nothing, there you will wish for nothing	From the writings of the Flemish philosopher Arnold Geulincx; also quoted by Samuel Beckett in his first published novel, Murphy.
ubi non accusator, ibi non iudex	where [there is] no accuser, there [is] no judge	Thus, there can be no judgment or case if no one charges a defendant with a crime. The phrase is sometimes parodied as "where there are no police, there is no speed limit".
ubi panis ibi patria	where there is bread, there is my country	
ubi pus, ibi evacua	where there is pus, there evacuate it	
ubi, re vera	when, in a true thing	Or "whereas, in reality..." Also rendered ubi, revera ("when, in fact" or "when, actually").
ubi societas, ibi ius	if there's a society, law will be there	By Aristotle.
ubi solitudinem faciunt pacem appellant	They make a desert and call it peace	from a speech by Calgacus reported/constructed by Tacitus, Agricola, ch. 30.
ubi sunt?	where are they?	Nostalgic theme of poems yearning for days gone by. From the line ubi sunt, qui ante nos fuerunt? ("Where are they, those who have gone before us?").
ubi unus, multi sunt	where [there is] one, [there] are many	
ubique, quo fas et gloria ducunt	everywhere, where right and glory leads	Motto of the Royal Engineers, Royal Artillery and most other Engineer or Artillery corps within the armies of the British Commonwealth (for example, the Royal Australian Engineers, Royal Canadian Engineers, Royal New Zealand Engineers, Royal Canadian Artillery, Royal Australian Artillery, Royal New Zealand Artillery). Interunit rivalry often leads to the sarcastic translation of ubique to mean all over the place in a derogative sense. Motto of the American Council on Foreign Relations, where the translation of ubique is often given as omnipresent, with the implication of pervasive hidden influence.
ultima forsan	perhaps the last	i.e. "perhaps your last hour." A sundial inscription.
ultima ratio	last method the final argument the last resort (as force)	The term ultima ratio originates from the Thirty Years' War; the last resort. Short form for the metaphor "The Last Resort of Kings and Common Men" referring to the act of declaring war. Used in names such as the French sniper rifle PGM Ultima Ratio and the fictional Reason weapon system. Louis XIV of France had Ultima Ratio Regum ("last argument of kings") cast on the cannons of his armies. In 1742, Frederick the Great ordered that all cannons of the Prussian Army be inscribed with the inscription Ultima Ratio Regis—the king’s last resort. Motto of the American 1st Battalion 11th Marines; the French Fourth Artillery Regiment; Swedish Artilleriregementet. Also, the Third Battery of the French Third Marine Artillery Regiment has the motto Ultima Ratio Tribuni. The term is also borne by the gorget owned by Captain William Cattell, which inspired the crescent worn by the revolutionary militia of South Carolina and in turn the state's flag. See also Ultima Ratio Regum (video game).
ultimo mense (ult.)	in the last month	Used in formal correspondence to refer to the previous month. Used with inst. ("this month") and prox. ("next month").
ultra vires	beyond powers	"Without authority". Used to describe an action done without proper authority, or acting without the rules. The term will most often be used in connection with appeals and petitions. Can be used as a preposition: "the court found that the law was ultra vires Parliament."
ultra posse nemo obligatur	No one is obligated beyond what he is able to do.	Equivalent to ad impossibilia nemo tenetur, impossibilium nulla obligatio est and nemo potest ad impossibile obligari.
ululas Athenas	(to send) owls to Athens	From Gerhard Gerhards' (1466–1536) [better known as Erasmus] collection of annotated Adagia (1508). Latin translation of a classical Greek proverb. Generally means putting large effort in a necessarily fruitless enterprise. Compare "selling coal to Newcastle".
una hirundo non facit ver	one swallow does not make summer	A single example of something positive does not necessarily mean that all subsequent similar instances will have the same outcome.
una salus victis nullam sperare salutem	the only safety for the conquered is to hope for no safety	Less literally, "the only safe bet for the vanquished is to expect no safety". Preceded by moriamur et in media arma ruamus ("let us die even as we rush into the midst of battle") in Virgil's Aeneid, book 2, lines 353–354. Used in Tom Clancy's novel Without Remorse, where character John Clark translates it as "the one hope of the doomed is not to hope for safety". It was said several times in "Andromeda" as the motto of the SOF units.
unitas, iustitia, spes	unity, justice, hope	Motto of Vilnius.
unitas per servitiam	unity through service	Motto for the St. Xavier's Institution Board of Librarians.
uniti aedificamus	united we build	Motto of the Mississippi makerspace community
uno flatu	in one breath	Used in criticism of inconsistent pleadings, i.e. "one cannot argue uno flatu both that the company does not exist and that it is also responsible for the wrong."
uno sumus animo	we are one of soul	Motto of Stedelijk Gymnasium Leiden
unus multorum	one of many	An average person.
unus papa Romae, unus portus Anconae, una turris Cremonae, una ceres Raconae	One pope in Rome, one port in Ancona, one tower in Cremona, one beer in Rakovník	Motto of the Czech Brewery in Rakovník.
Unus pro omnibus, omnes pro uno	One for all, all for one	unofficial motto of Switzerland, popularized by The Three Musketeers
Urbi et Orbi	to the city and the circle [of the lands]	Meaning "To Rome and the World". A standard opening of Roman proclamations. Also a traditional blessing by the pope.
urbs in horto	city in a garden	Motto of the City of Chicago.
usque ad finem	to the very end	Often used in reference to battle, implying a willingness to keep fighting until you die.
usus est magister optimus	practice is the best teacher.	In other words, practice makes perfect. Also sometimes translated "use makes master."
ut aquila versus coelum	As an eagle towards the sky	Motto of Bowdoin College, Brunswick, Maine
ut biberent quoniam esse nollent	so that they might drink, since they refused to eat	Also rendered with quando ("when") in place of quoniam. From a book by Suetonius (Vit. Tib., 2.2) and Cicero (De Natura Deorum, 2.3). The phrase was said by Roman admiral Publius Claudius Pulcher right before the battle of Drepana, as he threw overboard the sacred chickens which had refused to eat the grain offered them—an unwelcome omen of bad luck. Thus, the sense is, "if they do not perform as expected, they must suffer the consequences". He lost the battle disastrously.
ut cognoscant te	so that they may know You.	Motto of Boston College High School.
ut desint vires, tamen est laudanda voluntas	though the power be lacking, the will is to be praised all the same	From Ovid, Epistulae ex Ponto (III, 4, 79).
ut dicitur	as has been said; as above	
ut incepit fidelis sic permanet	as she began loyal, so she persists	Poetically, "Loyal she began, loyal she remains." Motto of Ontario.
ut infra	as below	
ut in omnibus glorificetur Deus.	that in all things, God may be glorified	Motto of the Order of Saint Benedict
ut mare quod ut ventus	to sea and into wind	Motto of USNS Washington Chambers
ut omnes te cognoscant	that all may know you	Motto of Niagara University
ut omnes unum sint	That they all may be one	Motto of Johannes Gutenberg University Mainz, Germany, and the United Church of Canada
ut pictura poesis	as is painting so is poetry	quote most famously uttered in Horace's Ars Poetica meaning poetry deserves the same careful interpretation as painting
ut prosim	that I may serve	Motto of Virginia Polytechnic Institute and State University
ut proverbium loquitur vetus...	you know what they say...	Lit: As the old proverb says...
ut quod omnes similiter tangit ab omnibus comprobetur		anything that affects all similarly must be approved by all; from Justinian's Code 5.59.5.2 (529 AD), promulgated into canon law by Pope Boniface VIII in 1298
ut res magis valeat quam pereat	that the matter may have effect rather than fail	
ut retro	as backwards	Or "as on the back side"; thus, "as on the previous page" (cf. ut supra).
ut Roma cadit, sic omnis terra	as Rome falls, so [falls] the whole world	
ut sit finis litium	so there might be an end of litigation	A traditional brocard. The full form is Interest reipublicae ut sit finis litium, "it is in the government's interest that there be an end to litigation." Often quoted in the context of statutes of limitation.
ut supra	as above	
ut tensio sic vis	as the extension, so the force	Robert Hooke's expression of his discovery of his law of linear elasticity. Also: Motto of École Polytechnique de Montréal. Motto of the British Watch and Clockmaker's Guild.
uti possidetis	as you possess it	Praetorian procedure to determine possession
uti possidetis juris	as you possess under law	Principle of international law where newly formed sovereign states inherit their borders prior to independence
utilis in ministerium	usefulness in service	Comes from 2 Timothy 4:11. Motto of Camberwell Girls Grammar School.
utraque unum	both into one	Also translated as "that the two may be one." Motto found in 18th century Spanish dollar coins. Motto of Georgetown University. From the Vulgate, Eph. 2:14, Ipse enim est pax nostra, qui fecit utraque unum, "For he is our peace, who hath made both one."
utrinque paratus	ready for anything	Motto of The British Parachute Regiment. Motto of the Belize National Coast Guard.

== V ==
Latin	Translation	Notes
vacate et scire	be still and know.	Motto of the University of Sussex
vade ad formicam	go to the ant	From the Vulgate, Proverbs 6:6. The full quotation translates as "Go to the ant, you sluggard; consider its ways and be wise!"
vade mecum	go with me	A vade-mecum or vademecum is an item one carries around, especially a handbook.
vade retro Satana	go back, Satan	An exhortation to Satan to be gone, often a Roman Catholic response to temptation. From a popular Medieval Roman Catholic exorcism formula, derived from the rebuke of Jesus Christ to St. Peter, as quoted in the Vulgate, Mark 8:33: vade retro me Satana ("get behind Me, Satan"). The phrase vade retro ("go back") is also in Terence's Formio, I, 4, 203.
vale	farewell	see also: ave atque vale
valenter volenter	strongly and willingly	Motto of HMS Valorous (L00)
vae, puto deus fio	ah, I think I am becoming a god	Last words of Vespasian according to Suetonius in his Twelve Caesars
vae victis	woe to the conquered	Attributed by Livy to Brennus, the chief of the Gauls, stated with his demand for more gold from the citizens of the sacked city of Rome in 390 BC.
vanitas vanitatum omnia vanitas	vanity of vanities; everything [is] vanity	Or more simply: "vanity, vanity, everything vanity". From the Vulgate, Ecclesiastes 1:2;12:8.
vaticinium ex eventu	prophecy from the event	A purported prediction stated as if it was made before the event it describes, while in fact being made thereafter.
vel non	or not	Summary of alternatives, e. g., "this action turns upon whether the claimant was the deceased's grandson vel non."
velle est posse	to be willing is to be able	Non-literally, "where there is a will, there is a way". It is the motto of Hillfield, one of the founding schools of Hillfield Strathallan College.
velocius quam asparagi coquantur	faster than asparagus can be cooked	Rendered by Robert Graves in I, Claudius as "as quick as boiled asparagus". Ascribed to Augustus by Suetonius in The Twelve Caesars, Book 2 (Augustus), para. 87. It refers to anything done very quickly. A very common variant is celerius quam asparagi cocuntur ("faster than asparagus [is] cooked").
vel similia	or similar (things), or the like	Abbreviated to vel sim. First attested in English usage in 1861.
velut arbor aevo	as a tree with the passage of time	Motto of the University of Toronto, Canada
veni, vidi, vici	I came, I saw, I conquered	The message supposedly sent by Julius Caesar to the Roman Senate to describe his battle against King Pharnaces II of Pontus near Zela in 47 BC.
venia aetatis	pardon my age	the privilege of age sometimes granted a minor under Roman or civil law, entitling the minor to the rights and liabilities of a person of full age, and resembling emancipation of minors in modern law
venia legendi or venia docendi	permission to read/teach	Part of habilitation process at universities
venturis ventis	to the coming winds	Motto of Brasília, the capital of Brazil
vera causa	true cause	
vera natura	true nature	Used in Metaphysics and specifically in Kant's Transcendental Idealism to refer to a subject as it exists in its logically distinct form rather than as it is perceived by the human faculty.
verba docent exempla trahunt	words instruct, illustrations lead	This refers to the relevance of illustrations, for example in preaching.
verba ex ore	words from mouth	Taking the words out of someone's mouth, speaking exactly what the other colloquist wanted to say.
verba ita sunt intelligenda ut res magis valeat quam pereat	words are to be understood such that the subject matter may be more effective than wasted	I. e., when explaining a subject, it is important to clarify rather than confuse.
verba vana aut risui non loqui	not to speak words in vain or to start laughter	A Roman Catholic religious precept, being Rule 56 of the Rule of Saint Benedict.
verba volant, scripta manent	words fly away, writings remain	
verbatim	word for word	The phrase refers to perfect transcription or quotation.
verbatim et literatim	word for word and letter by letter	
verbi divini minister	servant of the Divine Word	A phrase denoting a priest; cf. verbum Dei
verbi gratia (v. gr. or v. g.)	for example	Literally, "for the sake of a word".
verbum Dei	word of God	See also Logos (Christianity)
verbum dicendi	verb of speaking/utterance	word that expresses speech or introduces a quotation such as 'say', 'utter', 'ask'; a quotative
verbum Domini lucerna pedibus nostris	The word of the Lord [is] a light for our feet	Motto of the University of Groningen
verbum Domini manet in aeternum (VDMA)	the word of the Lord endures forever	Motto of the Lutheran Reformation
verb. sap. verbum sap.	a word to the wise [is sufficient]	A phrase denoting that the listener can fill in the omitted remainder, or enough is said. It is the truncation of verbum sapienti sat[is] est.
verbum volitans	flying word	A word that floats in the air, on which everyone is thinking and is just about to be imposed.
veritas	truth	Motto of many educational institutions
veritas aequitas	truth [and] justice	
veritas, bonitas, pulchritudo, sanctitas	truth, goodness, beauty, [and] sanctity	Motto of Fu Jen Catholic University, Taiwan
veritas Christo et ecclesiae	truth for Christ and church	The de iure motto of Harvard University, United States, which dates to its foundation; it is often shortened to veritas to remove its original religious meaning.
veritas cum libertate	truth with liberty	Motto of Winthrop University
veritas curat	truth cures	Motto of Jawaharlal Institute of Postgraduate Medical Education and Research
veritas Dei vincit	the truth of God conquers	Motto of the Hussites
veritas Domini manet in aeternum	the truth of the Lord remains for eternity	
veritas et fortitudo	truth and fortitude	One of the mottos of the Lyceum of the Philippines University
veritas et virtus	truth and virtue	Motto of the University of Pittsburgh, Methodist University, and Mississippi Christian University
veritas, fides, sapientia	truth, faith, [and] wisdom	Motto of Dowling Catholic High School
veritas in caritate	truth in charity	Motto of Bishop Wordsworth's School, St Munchin's College, and the University of Santo Tomas
veritas, iustitia, libertas	truth, justice, [and] liberty	Motto of the Free University of Berlin
veritas liberabit vos	truth shall liberate you	Motto of Xavier University – Ateneo de Cagayan
veritas lux mea	truth [is] my light	A common, non-literal translation is "truth enlightens me"; motto of Seoul National University, South Korea
veritas numquam perit	truth never expires	by Seneca the Younger
veritas odit moras	truth hates delay	by Seneca the Younger
veritas odium parit	truth breeds hatred	
veritas omnia vincit	truth conquers all	A quotation from a letter of Jan Hus; frequently used as a motto
veritas, probitas, iustitia	truth, honesty, justice	Motto of the University of Indonesia
veritas, unitas, caritas	truth, unity, [and] love	Motto of Villanova University, United States
veritas vincit	truth conquers	Cf. veritas omnia vincit. Motto on the standard of the presidents of Czechoslovakia and the Czech Republic, and of the Scottish Clan Keith
Veritas. Virtus. Libertas.	Truth. Virtue. Liberty.	Motto of the University of Szeged, Hungary
veritas vitæ magistra	truth is the teacher of life	Another plausible translation is "truth is the mistress of life". It is the unofficial motto of the University of Puerto Rico, Río Piedras and is inscribed in its tower.
veritas vos liberabit	truth will liberate you [all]	Motto of Johns Hopkins University, United States
veritate duce progredi	advancing with truth leading	Motto of the University of Arkansas, United States
[in] veritate et caritate	in truth and charity	Motto of Catholic Junior College, Singapore; St. Xavier's School, and Hazaribagh, India
veritate et virtute	with truth and virtue	Motto of Sydney Boys High School. It is alternatively rendered virtute et veritate ("with virtue and truth"), which is the motto of Walford Anglican School for Girls and Pocklington School.
veritatem dilexi	I esteemed truth	Alternatively, "I loved truth"; motto of Bryn Mawr College
veritatem fratribus testari	to bear witness to truth in fraternity	Motto of Xaverian Brothers High School
veritatem cognoscere	to know truth	Motto of the Clandestine Service of the United States Central Intelligence Agency
vero nihil verius	nothing [is] truer than truth	Motto of Mentone Girls' Grammar School
vero possumus	yes, we can	A variation of the campaign slogan of then-Senator Barack Obama, which was superimposed on a variation of the Great Seal of the United States during the US presidential campaign of 2008.
versus (vs) or (v.)	towards	Literally, "in the direction [of]". It is used in English meaning "against", e. g., the parties to litigation or a sports match; colloquially used to form the verb "verse, versed, versing" for "playing against".
vestigia nulla retrorsum	Never a backward step	Motto of Wanganui Collegiate School
vestis virum facit	Clothes make the man	Statement made by Erasmus to augment ancient commentary on the role of appearance in affirming authority
veto	I forbid	The word denotes the right to unilaterally forbid or void a specific proposal, especially legislation. It is derived from ancient Roman voting procedures.
vexata quaestio	vexed question	Latin legal phrase denoting a question that is often debated or considered, but is not generally settled, such that contrary answers may be held by different persons.
vexilla regis prodeunt inferni	forth go the banners of the king of Hell	Authored by Dante Alighieri in Canto XXXIV of the Inferno, the phrase is an allusion to and play upon the Latin Easter hymn Vexilla Regis. The phrase is repeatedly referenced in the works of Walter M. Miller, Jr.
vi coactus	under constraint	A legal phrase regarding contracts that indicates agreement made under duress.
vi et animo	with heart and soul	Alternatively, "strength and courage"; motto of the Ascham School
vi veri universum vivus vici	by the power of truth, I, while living, have conquered the universe	Magickal motto of Aleister Crowley.
via	by the road/way	The word denotes "by way of" or "by means of", e. g., "I will contact you via email".
via media	middle road/way	This phrase describes a compromise between two extremes or the radical center political position.
via, veritas, vita	the Way, the Truth, [and] the Life	Words of Jesus in John 14:6; motto of many institutions
viam sapientiae monstrabo tibi	I will show you the way of wisdom	Motto of DePaul University
vice	in place of	The word refers to one who acts in the place of another. It is used as a separate word or as a hyphenated prefix, e. g., "Vice President" and "Vice-Chancellor".
vice versa (Note: Occasionally, "versa vice" is used as an ironic, autological subversion of this phrase.)	with position turned	For other uses, see Vice Versa (disambiguation). Thus, "the other way around", "conversely", et cetera. Historically, in British English, vice is pronounced as two syllables, but in American and Canadian English the singular-syllable pronunciation is almost universal. Classical Latin pronunciation dictates that the letter "c" is only a hard sound, like "k". Moreover, the letter "v", when consonantal, represents /w/; hence WEE-keh WEHR-sah.
victoria amat curam	victory demands dedication	Motto of North Melbourne Football Club
victoria aut mors	Victory or death	Similar to aut vincere aut mori.
victoria concordia crescit	victory comes from harmony	Motto of Arsenal F.C.
victrix causa diis placuit sed victa Catoni	the victorious cause pleased the gods, but the conquered cause pleased Cato	Authored by Lucan in Pharsalia, 1, 128. The dedicatory inscription on the south face of the Confederate Memorial in Arlington National Cemetery, Virginia, United States.
vide	"see" or "refer to"	The word is used in scholarly citations.
vide infra (v. i.)	see below	The word is used in scholarly works.
vide supra (v. s.)	see above	The word is used in scholarly works to refer to previous text in the same document. It is sometimes truncated to supra.
videlicet (viz.)	"namely", "that is to say", or "as follows"	A contraction of videre licet ("it is permitted to see"), vide infra.
video et taceo	I see and keep silent	Motto of Queen Elizabeth I of England
video meliora proboque deteriora sequor	I see and approve of the better, but I follow the worse	From the Metamorphoses Book 7, 20-1 of Ovid, being a summary of the experience of akrasia.
video sed non credo	I see it, but I do not believe it	The statement of Caspar Hofmann after being shown proof of the circulatory system by William Harvey.
videre licet	"it is permitted to see" or "one may see"	used in scholarship
(doctrina) vim promovet insitam	(education) promotes the innate force	derived from Horace, Ode 4, 4; motto of the University of Bristol
vince malum bono	overcome evil with good	A partial quotation of Romans 12:21; motto of Old Swinford Hospital and Bishop Cotton School in Shimla
vincere est vivere	to conquer is to live	Motto of Captain John Smith
vincere scis Hannibal victoria uti nescis	you know [how] to win, Hannibal; you do not know [how] to use victory	According to Livy, a colonel in the cavalry stated this to Hannibal after victory in the Battle of Cannae in 216 BC, meaning that Hannibal should have marched on Rome immediately.
vincit omnia veritas	truth conquers all	motto of University of Mindanao, Philippines
vincit qui patitur	he conquers who endures	First attributed to the Roman scholar and satirist Persius; frequently used as a motto.
vincit qui se vincit	he (she) conquers who conquers himself (herself)	Motto of many educational institutions, including the Philadelphia High School for Girls and North Sydney Boys High School. It is alternatively rendered as bis vincit qui se vincit ("he (she) who prevails over himself (herself) is twice victorious"). It is also the motto of the Beast in Disney's film Beauty and the Beast, as seen inscribed in the castle's stained glass window near the beginning of the film.
vinculum juris	the chain of the law	The phrase denotes that a thing is legally binding. "A civil obligation is one which has a binding operation in law, vinculum juris." (Bouvier's Law Dictionary (1856), "Obligation")
vinum et musica laetificant cor	wine and music gladden the heart	Asterix and Caesar's Gift; it is a variation of vinum bonum laetificat cor hominis.
vinum regum, rex vinorum	the wine of kings, the king of wines	The phrase describes Hungarian Tokaji wine, and is attributed to King Louis XIV of France.
viperam sub ala nutricare	a viper nursed at the bosom	A caveat regarding trusting someone against his inherent nature; the moral of Aesop's fable The Farmer and the Viper.
vir quisque vir	every man a man	Motto of the US collegiate fraternity Lambda Chi Alpha.
vires acquirit eundo	she gathers strength as she goes	A quotation from Vergil's Aeneid, Book 4, 175, which in the original context refers to Pheme. Motto on the Coat of arms of Melbourne
virgo intacta	intact/untouched virgin	a female whose hymen is unbroken, who has never had sexual intercourse
viribus unitis	with united forces	Motto of the house of Habsburg-Lorraine
virile agitur	the manly thing is being done	Motto of Knox Grammar School
viriliter age	"act manfully" or "act courageously"	Motto of Marist College Ashgrove and other institutions
viriliter agite	act in a manly way	Motto of St Muredach's College and PAREF Southridge School for Boys. From Psalm 27
viriliter agite estote fortes	act manfully, be strong	Motto of Culford School
virtus et labor	virtue and [hard] work	
virtus et scientia	virtue and knowledge	Common motto
virtus in media stat	virtue stands in the middle	A principle derived from the ethical theory of Aristotle. Idiomatically, "good practice lies in the middle path" between two extremes. It is disputed whether media or medio is correct.
virtus junxit mors non separabit	that which virtue unites, let not death separate	
virtus laudata crescit	greatness increases with praise	Motto of the Berkhamsted School
virtus non stemma	valor, not garland	Motto of the Duke of Westminster, inscribed at his residence in Eaton, and the motto of Grosvenor Rowing Club and Harrow County School for Boys
virtus sola nobilitas	virtue alone [is] noble	Motto of Christian Brothers College, St Kilda; similar to sola nobilitat virtus
virtus tentamine gaudet	strength rejoices in the challenge	Motto of Hillsdale College, Michigan, United States
virtus unita fortior	virtue united [is] stronger	State motto of Andorra
virtute duce	led by virtue	
virtute duce comite fortuna	led by virtue, accompanied by [good] fortune	
virtute et armis	by virtue and arms	Alternatively, "by manliness and weapons". The State motto of Mississippi, United States. The phrase was possibly derived from the motto of Lord Gray de Wilton, virtute non armis fido ("I trust in virtue, not in arms").
virtute et constantia	by virtue and consistency	National motto of Malta. Also motto of the Estonian Internal Security Service.
virtute et eruditione	by virtue and by learning	Motto of Titchfield High School in Port Antonio, Jamaica.
virtute et industria	by virtue and industry	Motto of Bristol, United Kingdom
virtute et valor	by virtue and valour	Motto of St George’s Grammar School, Cape Town, and of a High School
virtute et veritate	by virtue and truth	Motto of Pocklington School
vis legis	the power of the law	
vis major	force majeure, superior force	
visio dei	vision of a god	
vita ante acta	a life done before	The phrase denotes a previous life, generally believed to be the result of reincarnation.
vita, dulcedo, spes	Mary, [our] life, sweetness, [and] hope	Motto of the University of Notre Dame, Indiana, United States, which is derived from the Roman Catholic hymn to the Blessed Virgin Mary titled Salve Regina.
vita incerta, mors certissima	life is uncertain, death is most certain	More simply, "the most certain thing in life is death".
vita mutatur, non tollitur	life is changed, not taken away	The phrase is a quotation from the preface of the first Roman Catholic rite of the Mass for the Dead.
vita patris	during the life of the father	Hence the term decessit vita patris (d. v. p) or "died v. p.", which is seen in genealogical works such as Burke's Peerage.
vitae summa brevis spem nos vetat incohare longam	the shortness of life prevents us from entertaining far-off hopes	This is a wistful refrain that is sometimes used ironically. It is derived from the first line of Horace's Ode 1. It was later used as the title of a short poem of Ernest Dowson.
vitae corona fides	faith is the crown of life	Motto of Colchester Royal Grammar School.
vitai lampada tradunt	they hand on the torch of life	A quotation from the poem of Lucretius, De rerum natura, Book 2, 77–79. The ordinary spelling vi-tae in two syllables had to be changed to vi-ta-ï in three syllables to satisfy the requirements of the poem's dactylic hexameters. Motto of the Sydney Church of England Grammar School and others.
vitam amplificare hominibus hominesque societati	mankind [who] extends the life of the community	Motto of East Los Angeles College, California, United States
viva voce	living voice	"by word of mouth"; oral exam; spoken, in-person, evidence in law
vivat crescat floreat	may it live, grow, [and] flourish	
vivat rex	may the king live	The acclamation is ordinary translated as "long live the king!". In the case of a queen, vivat regina ("long live the queen").
vivat rex, curat lex	long live the king, guardian of the law	found in Westerham parish church in Kent, England
vive memor leti	live remembering death	Authored by Persius. Cf. memento mori.
vive ut vivas	live so that you may live	The phrase suggests that one should live life to the fullest and without fear of the possible consequences.
vivere est cogitare	to live is to think	Authored by Cicero. Cf. cogito, ergo sum.
vivere militare est	to live is to fight	Authored by Seneca the Younger in Epistle 96, 5. Cf. the allegory of Miles Christianus based on militia est vita hominis from the Vulgate, Book of Job 7:1.
vocare ad regnum	call to fight	Alternatively, "call to Kingdom". Motto of professional wrestler Triple H, and seen in his entrance video.
vocatus atque non vocatus Deus aderit	called and not called, God will be present	Alternatively, "called and even not called, God approaches". Attributed to the Oracle at Delphi. Motto of Carl Jung, and inscribed in his home and grave.
volenti non fit injuria	to one willing, no harm is done	Alternatively, "to him who consents, no harm is done". The principle is used in the law of torts and denotes that one can not be held liable for injuries inflicted on another who consented to the act that injured him.
volo non fugia	I fly but do not flee	Motto of HMS Venetia
vos estis sal terrae	you are the salt of the earth	Biblical sentence proclaimed by Jesus
votum separatum	separate vow	The phrase denotes an independent, minority voice.
vox clamantis in deserto	the voice of one clamoring in the desert	Or traditionally, "the voice of one crying in the wilderness". A quotation of the Vulgate, Isaiah 40:3, and quoted by St. John the Baptist in Mark 1:3 and John 1:23). Motto of Dartmouth College, Hanover, New Hampshire, United States.
vox nihili	voice of nothing	The phrase denotes a useless or ambiguous statement.
vox populi	voice of the people	The phrase denotes a brief interview of a common person that is not previously arranged, e. g., an interview on a street. It is sometimes truncated to "vox pop."
vox populi, vox Dei	the voice of the people [is] the voice of God	
vulpes pilum mutat, non mores	the fox changes his fur, not his habits	By extension, and in common morality, humanity can change their attitudes, but they will hardly change their objectives or what they have set themselves to achieve. Ascribed to Titus by Suetonius in the eighth book (chapter 16) of The Twelve Caesars.
