= 1782 in literature =

This article contains information about the literary events and publications of 1782.

== Events ==
Catherine Blake, c. 1805, depicted by her husband William Blake

- January 13 – Friedrich Schiller's first play, the revolutionary melodrama The Robbers (Die Räuber), causes a sensation in Mannheim at its first performance. Schiller, a military doctor at the time, is arrested for attending the performance without having permission to leave his regiment.
- August 18 – William Blake marries Catherine Boucher at St Mary's Church, Battersea. In the same year, he meets his future patron, John Flaxman.
- October 10 – Sarah Siddons makes a triumphant return to the Drury Lane Theatre in London, in the title role of David Garrick's adaptation of Thomas Southerne's Isabella, or, The Fatal Marriage.
- unknown dates
  - Charles Dibdin becomes joint manager of the Royal Circus, afterwards known as the Surrey Theatre, in London.
  - The Complete Library of the Four Treasuries (Siku Quanshu) is completed, the largest literary compilation in China's history. The books are bound in 36,381 volumes with more than 79,000 chapters, containing about 2.3 million pages and 800 million Chinese characters. The bibliography omits some titles, which are included in the Annotated Bibliography of the Four Treasuries the following year.Wilkinson, Endymion (2000). Chinese History: A Manual. Harvard University Asia Center. p. 276. ISBN 9780674002470.

== New books ==
=== Fiction ===
- Elizabeth Blower – George Bateman
- Fanny Burney (anonymously) – Cecilia
- J. Hector St. John de Crèvecœur – Letters from an American Farmer
- Pierre Choderlos de Laclos – Les Liaisons dangereuses
- Lady Mary Hamilton – The Life of Mrs. Justman
- Johann Karl August Musäus – Volksmärchen der Deutschen (first volume)
- Betje Wolff and Aagje Deken – Historie van mejuffrouw Sara Burgerhart

=== Drama ===
- Vittorio Alfieri – Saul
- Hannah Cowley – The Belle's Stratagem
- Richard Cumberland – The Walloons
- Charles Nicolas Favart – Le Diable boiteux
- Denis Fonvizin – The Minor
- Jean-Pierre Claris de Florian – Le Bon Ménage
- Louis-Sébastien Mercier
  - Le Déserteur (first performed)
  - La Destruction de la ligue
- John O'Keeffe
  - The Castle of Andalusia
  - Harlequin Teague
  - The Lord Mayor's Day

=== Poetry ===
- William Cowper
  - The Diverting History of John Gilpin
  - Verses Supposed to be Written by Alexander Selkirk
  - Poems
- John Freeth – Modern Songs
- Johann Wolfgang von Goethe – "Erlkönig"
- William Hayley – An Essay on Epic Poetry in Five Epistles to Mason
- William Mason
  - An Archaeological Epistle to Jeremiah Milles....
  - King Stephen's Watch
- Hannah More – Sacred Dramas for Young Persons
- Edward Rushton – The Dismember'd Empire (attributed)
- John Scott – Poetical Works
- Helen Maria Williams – Edwin and Eltruda
- John Wolcot as "Peter Pindar" – Lyric Odes, to the Royal Academicians

=== Non-fiction ===
- Thomas Day – Reflections upon the Present State of England, and the Independence of America
- William Gilpin – Observations on the River Wye, and Several Parts of South Wales
- Edmond Malone – Cursory Observations on the Poems Attributed to Thomas Rowley (debunking Chatterton's hoax)
- John Nichols – Biographical and Literary Anecdotes of William Bowyer
- Thomas Pennant – The Journey from Chester to London
- Isaac Reed – Biographia Dramatica
- Joseph Ritson – Observations on the Three First Volumes of the History of English Poetry (on Thomas Warton)
- Jean-Jacques Rousseau
  - The Confessions
  - Reveries of a Solitary Walker
- J. Hector St. John – Letters from an American Farmer
- Louis Claude de Saint-Martin – Tableau naturel des rapports qui existent entre Dieu, l'homme, et l'univers
- Ignatius Sancho – Letters of the Late Ignatius Sancho, an African
- Thomas Spence – The History of Crusonia on Robinson Crusoe's Island
- Emanuel Swedenborg – Heaven and Hell (translated by Antoine-Joseph Pernety from Latin into French)
- Thomas Tyrwhitt – A Vindication of the Appendix to the Poems, called Rowley's
- Joseph Warton – An Essay on the Writings and Genius of Pope
- Thomas Warton – An Enquiry into the Authenticity of the Poems Attributed to Thomas Rowley

== Births ==
- January 30 – Ann Taylor, English poet and critic (died 1866)
- February – Georg Koës, Danish philologist (died 1811)
- March 2 – Isaac Pocock, English dramatist and painter (died 1835)
- April 16 – William Jerdan, Scottish journalist (died 1869)
- June 9 – Peter Fisher, Canadian historian (died 1848)
- September 7 – Susan Edmonstone Ferrier, Scottish novelist (died 1854)
- September 19 – Richard Lower, English dialect poet (died 1865)
- unknown dates
  - Alexander Jamieson, Scottish textbook writer, schoolmaster and rhetorician (died 1850)
  - Grace Kennedy, Scottish novelist (died 1825)
  - Benjamin Thorpe, English scholar of Anglo-Saxon (died 1870)

== Deaths ==
- January 1 – Juan Crespí, Mallorcan explorer and diarist (born 1721)
- January 21 – Giovanni Cristofano Amaduzzi, Italian philologist (born 1740)
- January 29 – Johanna Charlotte Unzer, German writer (b. 1725)
- February 10 – Friedrich Christoph Oetinger, German theosopher (born 1702)
- February 14 – Thomas Newton, English Biblical commentator (born 1704)
- April 12 – Pietro Metastasio, Italian poet (born 1698)
- December 27 – Henry Home, Lord Kames, Scottish philosopher (born 1696)
- unknown date – Jean-Martin de Prades, French theologian (born c. 1720)
