= List of Latin phrases (U) =

This page is one of a series listing English translations of notable Latin phrases, such as veni, vidi, vici and et cetera. Some of the phrases are themselves translations of Greek phrases, as ancient Greek rhetoric and literature started centuries before the beginning of Latin literature in ancient Rome.

Latin	Translation	Notes
uberrima fides	most abundant faith	Or "utmost good faith" (cf. bona fide). A legal maxim of insurance contracts requiring all parties to deal in good faith.
ubertas et fidelitas	fertility and faithfulness	Motto of Tasmania.
ubi amor, ibi dolor	where [there is] love, there [is] pain	
ubi bene, ibi patria	where [it is] well, there [is] the fatherland	Or "Home is where it's good"; see also ubi panis ibi patria.
ubi caritas et amor, Deus ibi est	where there is charity and love, God is there	
ubi dubium, ibi libertas	where [there is] doubt, there [is] freedom	Anonymous proverb.
ubi jus, ibi remedium	Where [there is] a right, there [is] a remedy	
ubi maior, minor cessat	Where [there is] the greater, the lesser ceases	When there is something of greater importance or authority, things of lesser importance are not relevant.
ubi mel, ibi apes	where [there is] honey, there [are] bees	Valuable things are often protected and difficult to obtain.
ubi libertas. ibi patria	where [there is] liberty, there [is] the fatherland	Or "where there is liberty, there is my country". Patriotic motto.
ubi nihil vales, ibi nihil velis	where you are worth nothing, there you will wish for nothing	From the writings of the Flemish philosopher Arnold Geulincx; also quoted by Samuel Beckett in his first published novel, Murphy.
ubi non accusator, ibi non iudex	where [there is] no accuser, there [is] no judge	Thus, there can be no judgment or case if no one charges a defendant with a crime. The phrase is sometimes parodied as "where there are no police, there is no speed limit".
ubi panis ibi patria	where there is bread, there is my country	
ubi pus, ibi evacua	where there is pus, there evacuate it	
ubi, re vera	when, in a true thing	Or "whereas, in reality..." Also rendered ubi, revera ("when, in fact" or "when, actually").
ubi societas, ibi ius	if there's a society, law will be there	By Aristotle.
ubi solitudinem faciunt pacem appellant	They make a desert and call it peace	from a speech by Calgacus reported/constructed by Tacitus, Agricola, ch. 30.
ubi sunt?	where are they?	Nostalgic theme of poems yearning for days gone by. From the line ubi sunt, qui ante nos fuerunt? ("Where are they, those who have gone before us?").
ubi unus, multi sunt	where [there is] one, [there] are many	
ubique, quo fas et gloria ducunt	everywhere, where right and glory leads	Motto of the Royal Engineers, Royal Artillery and most other Engineer or Artillery corps within the armies of the British Commonwealth (for example, the Royal Australian Engineers, Royal Canadian Engineers, Royal New Zealand Engineers, Royal Canadian Artillery, Royal Australian Artillery, Royal New Zealand Artillery). Interunit rivalry often leads to the sarcastic translation of ubique to mean all over the place in a derogative sense. Motto of the American Council on Foreign Relations, where the translation of ubique is often given as omnipresent, with the implication of pervasive hidden influence.
ultima forsan	perhaps the last	i.e. "perhaps your last hour." A sundial inscription.
ultima ratio	last method the final argument the last resort (as force)	The term ultima ratio originates from the Thirty Years' War; the last resort. Short form for the metaphor "The Last Resort of Kings and Common Men" referring to the act of declaring war. Used in names such as the French sniper rifle PGM Ultima Ratio and the fictional Reason weapon system. Louis XIV of France had Ultima Ratio Regum ("last argument of kings") cast on the cannons of his armies. In 1742, Frederick the Great ordered that all cannons of the Prussian Army be inscribed with the inscription Ultima Ratio Regis—the king’s last resort. Motto of the American 1st Battalion 11th Marines; the French Fourth Artillery Regiment; Swedish Artilleriregementet. Also, the Third Battery of the French Third Marine Artillery Regiment has the motto Ultima Ratio Tribuni. The term is also borne by the gorget owned by Captain William Cattell, which inspired the crescent worn by the revolutionary militia of South Carolina and in turn the state's flag. See also Ultima Ratio Regum (video game).
ultimo mense (ult.)	in the last month	Used in formal correspondence to refer to the previous month. Used with inst. ("this month") and prox. ("next month").
ultra vires	beyond powers	"Without authority". Used to describe an action done without proper authority, or acting without the rules. The term will most often be used in connection with appeals and petitions. Can be used as a preposition: "the court found that the law was ultra vires Parliament."
ultra posse nemo obligatur	No one is obligated beyond what he is able to do.	Equivalent to ad impossibilia nemo tenetur, impossibilium nulla obligatio est and nemo potest ad impossibile obligari.
ululas Athenas	(to send) owls to Athens	From Gerhard Gerhards' (1466–1536) [better known as Erasmus] collection of annotated Adagia (1508). Latin translation of a classical Greek proverb. Generally means putting large effort in a necessarily fruitless enterprise. Compare "selling coal to Newcastle".
una hirundo non facit ver	one swallow does not make summer	A single example of something positive does not necessarily mean that all subsequent similar instances will have the same outcome.
una salus victis nullam sperare salutem	the only safety for the conquered is to hope for no safety	Less literally, "the only safe bet for the vanquished is to expect no safety". Preceded by moriamur et in media arma ruamus ("let us die even as we rush into the midst of battle") in Virgil's Aeneid, book 2, lines 353–354. Used in Tom Clancy's novel Without Remorse, where character John Clark translates it as "the one hope of the doomed is not to hope for safety". It was said several times in "Andromeda" as the motto of the SOF units.
unitas, iustitia, spes	unity, justice, hope	Motto of Vilnius.
unitas per servitiam	unity through service	Motto for the St. Xavier's Institution Board of Librarians.
uniti aedificamus	united we build	Motto of the Mississippi makerspace community
uno flatu	in one breath	Used in criticism of inconsistent pleadings, i.e. "one cannot argue uno flatu both that the company does not exist and that it is also responsible for the wrong."
uno sumus animo	we are one of soul	Motto of Stedelijk Gymnasium Leiden
unus multorum	one of many	An average person.
unus papa Romae, unus portus Anconae, una turris Cremonae, una ceres Raconae	One pope in Rome, one port in Ancona, one tower in Cremona, one beer in Rakovník	Motto of the Czech Brewery in Rakovník.
Unus pro omnibus, omnes pro uno	One for all, all for one	unofficial motto of Switzerland, popularized by The Three Musketeers
Urbi et Orbi	to the city and the circle [of the lands]	Meaning "To Rome and the World". A standard opening of Roman proclamations. Also a traditional blessing by the pope.
urbs in horto	city in a garden	Motto of the City of Chicago.
usque ad finem	to the very end	Often used in reference to battle, implying a willingness to keep fighting until you die.
usus est magister optimus	practice is the best teacher.	In other words, practice makes perfect. Also sometimes translated "use makes master."
ut aquila versus coelum	As an eagle towards the sky	Motto of Bowdoin College, Brunswick, Maine
ut biberent quoniam esse nollent	so that they might drink, since they refused to eat	Also rendered with quando ("when") in place of quoniam. From a book by Suetonius (Vit. Tib., 2.2) and Cicero (De Natura Deorum, 2.3). The phrase was said by Roman admiral Publius Claudius Pulcher right before the battle of Drepana, as he threw overboard the sacred chickens which had refused to eat the grain offered them—an unwelcome omen of bad luck. Thus, the sense is, "if they do not perform as expected, they must suffer the consequences". He lost the battle disastrously.
ut cognoscant te	so that they may know You.	Motto of Boston College High School.
ut desint vires, tamen est laudanda voluntas	though the power be lacking, the will is to be praised all the same	From Ovid, Epistulae ex Ponto (III, 4, 79).
ut dicitur	as has been said; as above	
ut incepit fidelis sic permanet	as she began loyal, so she persists	Poetically, "Loyal she began, loyal she remains." Motto of Ontario.
ut infra	as below	
ut in omnibus glorificetur Deus.	that in all things, God may be glorified	Motto of the Order of Saint Benedict
ut mare quod ut ventus	to sea and into wind	Motto of USNS Washington Chambers
ut omnes te cognoscant	that all may know you	Motto of Niagara University
ut omnes unum sint	That they all may be one	Motto of Johannes Gutenberg University Mainz, Germany, and the United Church of Canada
ut pictura poesis	as is painting so is poetry	quote most famously uttered in Horace's Ars Poetica meaning poetry deserves the same careful interpretation as painting
ut prosim	that I may serve	Motto of Virginia Polytechnic Institute and State University
ut proverbium loquitur vetus...	you know what they say...	Lit: As the old proverb says...
ut quod omnes similiter tangit ab omnibus comprobetur		anything that affects all similarly must be approved by all; from Justinian's Code 5.59.5.2 (529 AD), promulgated into canon law by Pope Boniface VIII in 1298
ut res magis valeat quam pereat	that the matter may have effect rather than fail	
ut retro	as backwards	Or "as on the back side"; thus, "as on the previous page" (cf. ut supra).
ut Roma cadit, sic omnis terra	as Rome falls, so [falls] the whole world	
ut sit finis litium	so there might be an end of litigation	A traditional brocard. The full form is Interest reipublicae ut sit finis litium, "it is in the government's interest that there be an end to litigation." Often quoted in the context of statutes of limitation.
ut supra	as above	
ut tensio sic vis	as the extension, so the force	Robert Hooke's expression of his discovery of his law of linear elasticity. Also: Motto of École Polytechnique de Montréal. Motto of the British Watch and Clockmaker's Guild.
uti possidetis	as you possess it	Praetorian procedure to determine possession
uti possidetis juris	as you possess under law	Principle of international law where newly formed sovereign states inherit their borders prior to independence
utilis in ministerium	usefulness in service	Comes from 2 Timothy 4:11. Motto of Camberwell Girls Grammar School.
utraque unum	both into one	Also translated as "that the two may be one." Motto found in 18th century Spanish dollar coins. Motto of Georgetown University. From the Vulgate, Eph. 2:14, Ipse enim est pax nostra, qui fecit utraque unum, "For he is our peace, who hath made both one."
utrinque paratus	ready for anything	Motto of The British Parachute Regiment. Motto of the Belize National Coast Guard.
