= Ultima Ratio Regum (video game) =

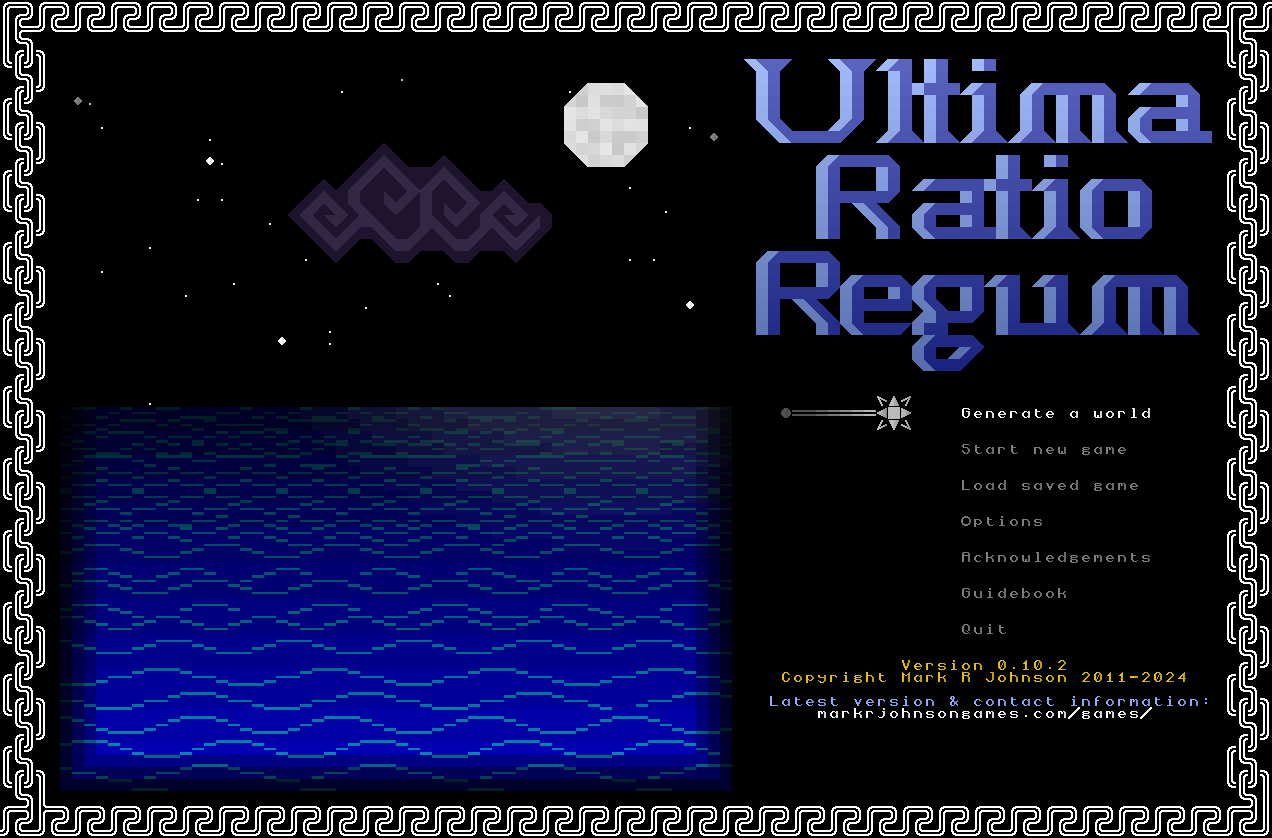
- Title screen of Ultima Ratio Regum
- Designer: Mark R Johnson
- Platform: Microsoft Windows
- Release: 9 July 2012
- Genres: Roguelike, puzzle
- Mode: Single-player

Ultima Ratio Regum (Latin for 'the last argument of kings') is a roguelike created by Mark R Johnson. It was started in 2011 and was intended to be a ten-year project, and has returned to active development since December 2020 after several years without a release. The game takes place in a procedurally generated world around the time of the Scientific Revolution. It tasks the player with trying to "uncover a procedurally-generated mystery in the most culturally, religiously and socially detailed procedural world ever generated", and the game's core technical objective is "nothing short of the procedural generation of culture". The next planned release is the 0.11 version, which will for the first time include a fully procedurally generated path of riddles and clues to be followed.

== Gameplay ==
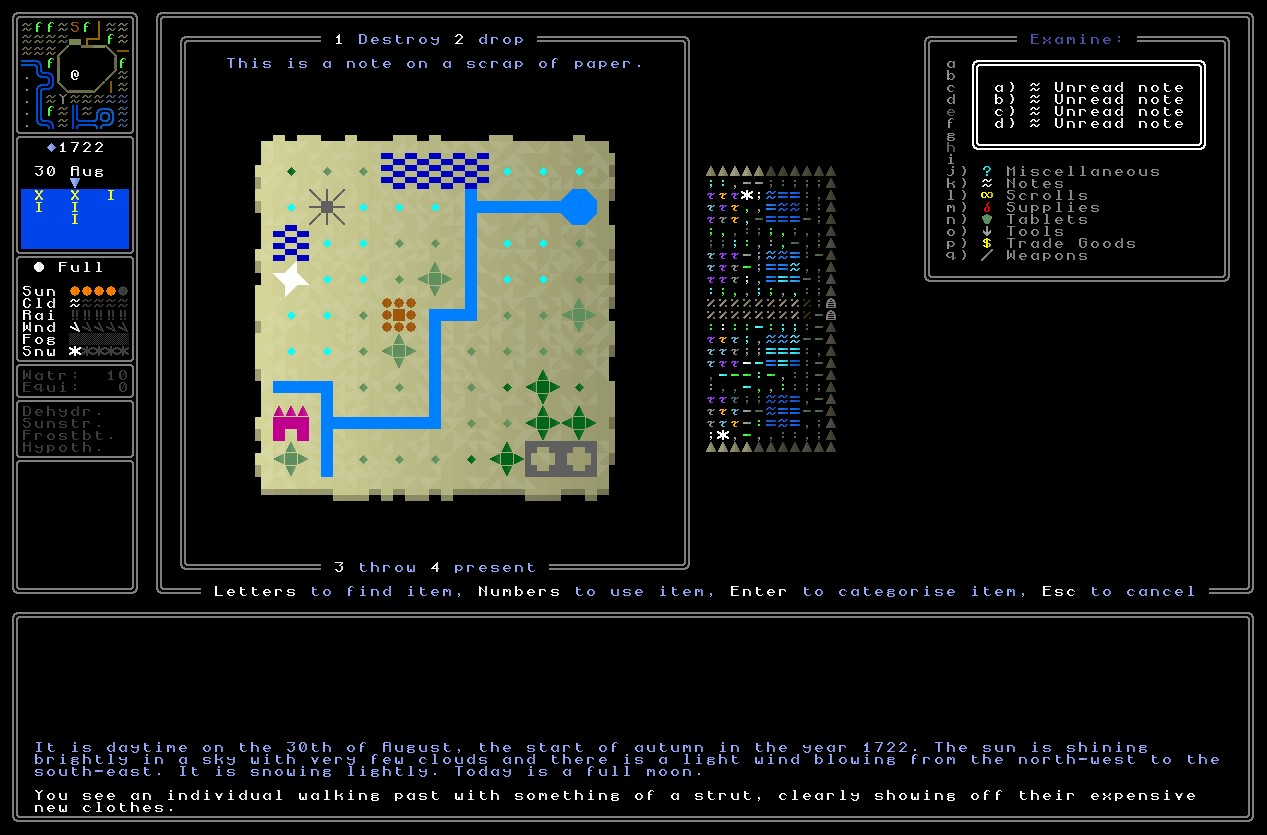
A generated map for a currently unvisited part of the game world

Ultima Ratio Regum is presented in a roguelike manner with ANSI characters and features permadeath. Unlike most roguelikes, Johnson has stated that combat itself will not be the main source of difficulty, and the game is instead focused around a kind of cultural detective-work wherein the player pieces together clues from the world's generated culture, history, religions, social norms, etc., to decipher procedurally generated riddles and mysteries similar in nature to those found in games like La-Mulana and Outer Wilds. This requires the procedural generation of many types of clues, both visual and textual. The whole world is procedurally generated, from solar systems (the macro scale) to small details like tombstone engravings which are displayed with generated ANSI graphics (the micro scale). Puzzles are generated anew each game and scattered around the world, to ensure that they are "not so easily spoiled by a wiki". The game does extensive procedural generation of aesthetics and graphics, ranging from tables and chairs to ornate vases and religious altars.

Civilizations have different policies that affect the player to varying degrees. NPCs have their faces generated in ANSI according to their civilization's genetic features and social norms (earrings, tattoos), and can be viewed ingame so the player may figure out the social class or origin of an NPC. There is no consistent cultural style, so in one game tattoos might be worn by people in lower-class districts, while in another one they might be a distinct feature of the ruling class.

== Development ==
=== Developer ===
Mark R Johnson is currently a Senior Lecturer in game studies at the University of Sydney. After his undergraduate degree in politics and sociology, he studied for a PhD in science and technology studies from 2011 to 2014. He is also an ex-professional poker player.

=== Influence ===
According to Johnson, Jorge Luis Borges, who "wrote a lot about themes which resonate with roguelikes but haven't been fully explored", Umberto Eco and Neal Stephenson were all inspirations for Ultima Ratio Regum.
