= Le Bon Père =

Play written by Jean-Pierre Claris de Florian

- Original language: French
- Written by: Jean-Pierre Claris de Florian
- Characters: Arlequin; Nisida; Cléante; Nérine
- Series: The Arlequinades
- Genre: comedy
- Setting: Arlequin's home in Paris

Premiere
- Date: 1784
- Place: France

Le Bon Père (English: The Good Father) is a one act comedy by Jean-Pierre Claris de Florian. It was first performed by the Comédie Italienne in 1784. Le Bon Père is the last of a trilogy of plays called "The Arlequinades" that tell the story of Arlequin, his wife Argentine, and later, their children. The other two plays in the series are Les Deux Billets and Le Bon Ménage.

== Plot summary ==
Several years have passed since Arlequin's adventures in Le Bon Ménage. His wife and two sons have died, and he now lives alone with a daughter in a fine apartment in Paris, having inherited a large sum of money from a certain Count de Valcour.

The play opens with Cléante and Nérine. Cléante is a soldier who fell in love with Arlequin's daughter, Nisida, and was hired on as Arlequin's secretary to be near her. Arlequin betrothes his daughter to the Marquis of Yrville, but she refuses since she is in love with Cléante. Coming from a simple background himself, Arlequin is sympathetic to the young lovers, but he feels that they cannot marry due to the differences in their social status.

Arlequin asks Cléante to leave his household, and Cléante reveals that he is the son of a man of wealth: the Count de Valcour. Arlequin decides to give his fortune over to Cléante, since it is rightfully his. Cléante and Nisida are free to marry, and Cléante accepts Arlequin as father.

== Characters ==
- Arlequin, a wealthy man
- Nisida, his daughter
- Nérine, Nisida's servant
- Cléante, in love with Nisida
