= Ubi panis ibi patria =

Latin expression

Ubi panis ibi patria is a Latin expression meaning "Where there is bread, there is (my) country" (or home, or homeland). According to J. Hector St. John de Crèvecœur in "What is an American?", the third of his Letters from an American Farmer, this is the motto of all European immigrants to the United States. It is not clear whether the phrase originates in Crèvecœur's writings or somebody else's.

In any case, it is reminiscent in its form of another motto that may have served as a model, Ubi bene ibi patria ("Homeland is where it (life) is good"; lit. where good, there fatherland). This latter expression in turn reminds of a verse (Teucer, fr. 291) of the Roman tragic poet Marcus Pacuvius (ca. 220–130 BC) quoted by Cicero (106–43 BC): Patria est ubicumque est bene (45 BC, Tusculanae Disputationes V, 108). Jean-Jacques Rousseau also alludes to this motto in his 1772 Considerations on the Government of Poland.

== See also ==
- Cosmopolitanism
- List of Latin phrases
