= Les Deux Billets =

- Original language: French
- Written by: Jean-Pierre Claris de Florian
- Characters: Arlequin; Scapin; Argentine
- Series: The Arlequinades
- Genre: comedy
- Setting: near Argentine's house in Paris

Premiere
- Date: 1779
- Place: France

Les Deux Billets (English: The Two Tickets) is a one act comedy by Jean-Pierre Claris de Florian. It was first performed by the Comédie Italienne in 1779. Les Deux Billets is the first of a trilogy of plays called "The Arlequinades" that tell the story of Arlequin, his wife Argentine, and later, their children. The other two plays in the series are Le Bon Ménage and Le Bon Père.

== Plot summary ==
The play opens with Arlequin reading a love letter from the wealthy Argentine. In spite of the fact that Argentine loves him, Arlequin wishes that they were equally rich or poor so that she might be certain that he loves her for herself and not her money. Arlequin regularly plays the lottery, and his rival Scapin arrives with the day's lottery numbers. Arlequin has won. Scapin gives Arlequin false directions to the lottery headquarters and attempts to steal the ticket from Arlequin's pocket; however, instead of grabbing the ticket, he grabs Argentine's love letter.

Trying to profit from the situation, Scapin goes to Argentine and shows her the love letter, saying that Arlequin gave it to another woman. Argentine believes this, and when Arlequin comes back from his unsuccessful trip to the lottery, Argentine is angry and says she will marry the man who is holding her love letter. Scapin produces the love letter, and Arlequin is devastated.

Afterwards, Scapin tells Arlequin that Argentine gave him the love letter. Arlequin, desperate, agrees to trade the lottery ticket for the love letter. Scapin does, assuming that Argentine will not listen to Arlequin. However, when she discovers that Arlequin traded the lottery ticket for her love letter, Argentine realizes the true value of Arlequin's love.

When Scapin returns, Argentine pretends to be jealous and asks him to reveal the note that he has in his pocket. Scapin pulls out the lottery ticket, and Argentine snatches it. Argentine and Arlequin are now together and very wealthy.

== Characters ==
- Arlequin, in love with Argentine
- Scapin, Arlequin's rival
- Argentine, in love with Arlequin
