= Jean Turcan =

French sculptor (1846–1895)

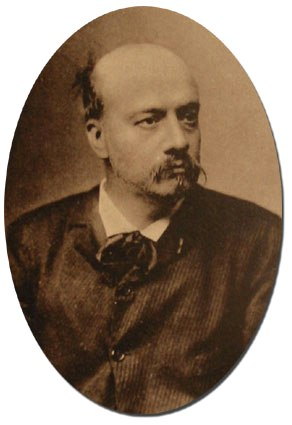
A photograph of Jean Turcan from the 1890s

Jean Turcan (Arles, 13 September 1846 – Arles, 3 January 1895) was a French sculptor who specialized particularly in public figures.

== Biography ==
Turcan was born to a poor flour-packer and was himself constrained by poverty to work as a knacker. Having been given a scholarship by the city of Marseille, he went to study under Antoine Bontoux at the École des Beaux-Arts in Paris until his studies were interrupted by the Franco-Prussian War. In 1871 he resumed under Jules Cavelier and went on to win second prize in the 1876 Prix de Rome for his Jason carrying off the golden fleece. Two years later he exhibited his Ganymede at the Salon, winning second prize. A bronze version (destroyed in World War II) was placed in the park at Aix-les-Bains and seen there by Paul Verlaine, who wrote a homoerotic poem about it in 1889.

Official commissions now began to come Turcan's way, including statues of Cardinal de Richelieu (1880) and the historian Jules Michelet (1882) for the Hotel de Ville, Paris. In 1883 his best-known statue, depicting the fable of The Blind Man and the Lame, won him a first class medal at the Salon. Subsequently, the French state arranged for him to work up the plaster cast in marble, a project he worked on for three years, and it was exhibited at the 1888 Salon. On this occasion it received a medal of honour, while the Revue des Deux Mondes devoted to it several pages of enthusiastic description, pointing out its dynamic yet compassionate qualities. The next year it was given a further prize at the Universal Exhibition and afterwards was placed in the Musée du Luxembourg. Later Turcan urged the city of Marseille to fund a bronze version. This was eventually agreed in 1892 and, after being exhibited at the Paris World Fair of 1900, the statue was installed in the city in 1901. Subsequently, it was to be melted down during World War II.

But despite success and the award of the Legion of Honour in 1888, financial difficulties forced Turcan to work for a period in the studio of Auguste Rodin, where he was responsible for carving a large-scale version of the sculptor's The Kiss. Later official commissions included the figure of Painting on the east façade of the Cour Carrée in the Louvre Palace and the war memorial for the fallen of the Bouches-du-Rhône militia during the Franco-Prussian war. Eventually the victim of a lingering ataxia malady, he died shortly before the money raised by fellow artists to support him could be delivered.

== Works ==
Turcan's great war monument can be found in Marseille where the Allée Gambetta and Allée de La Canebière meet, while the marble version of "The Blindman and the Lame" (L'Aveugle et le Paralytique) is now in the episcopal palace of Arles. Portrait busts are in the following museums: The sculptor Antonin Idrac (1886) at the Toulouse Musée des Augustins; the theologian Pierre Charron (1888) in the Musée Paul Dubois-Alfred Boucher, Nogent-sur-Seine; the poet Clément Marot (1888) in the Musée de Cahors Henri-Martin. His final commission, a bust of Fulgence Fresnel, was destined for the Académie des Inscriptions et Belles-Lettres to which he had belonged.

== Gallery ==
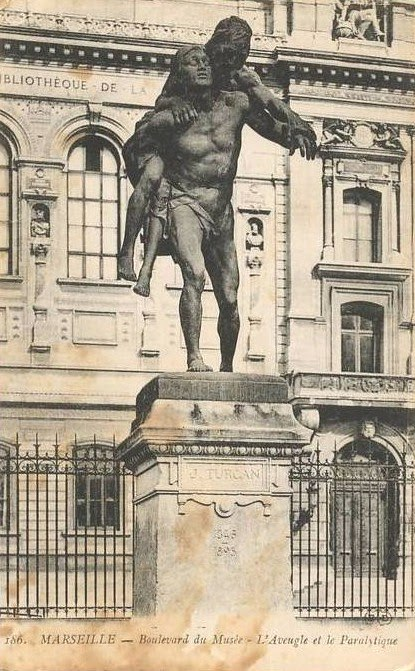
The bronze L'Aveugle et le paralytique, formerly in Marseille

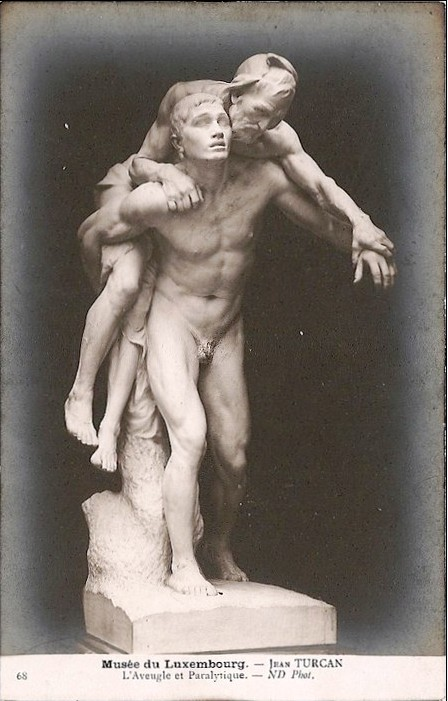
The marble version formerly in the Musée de Luxembourg, Paris

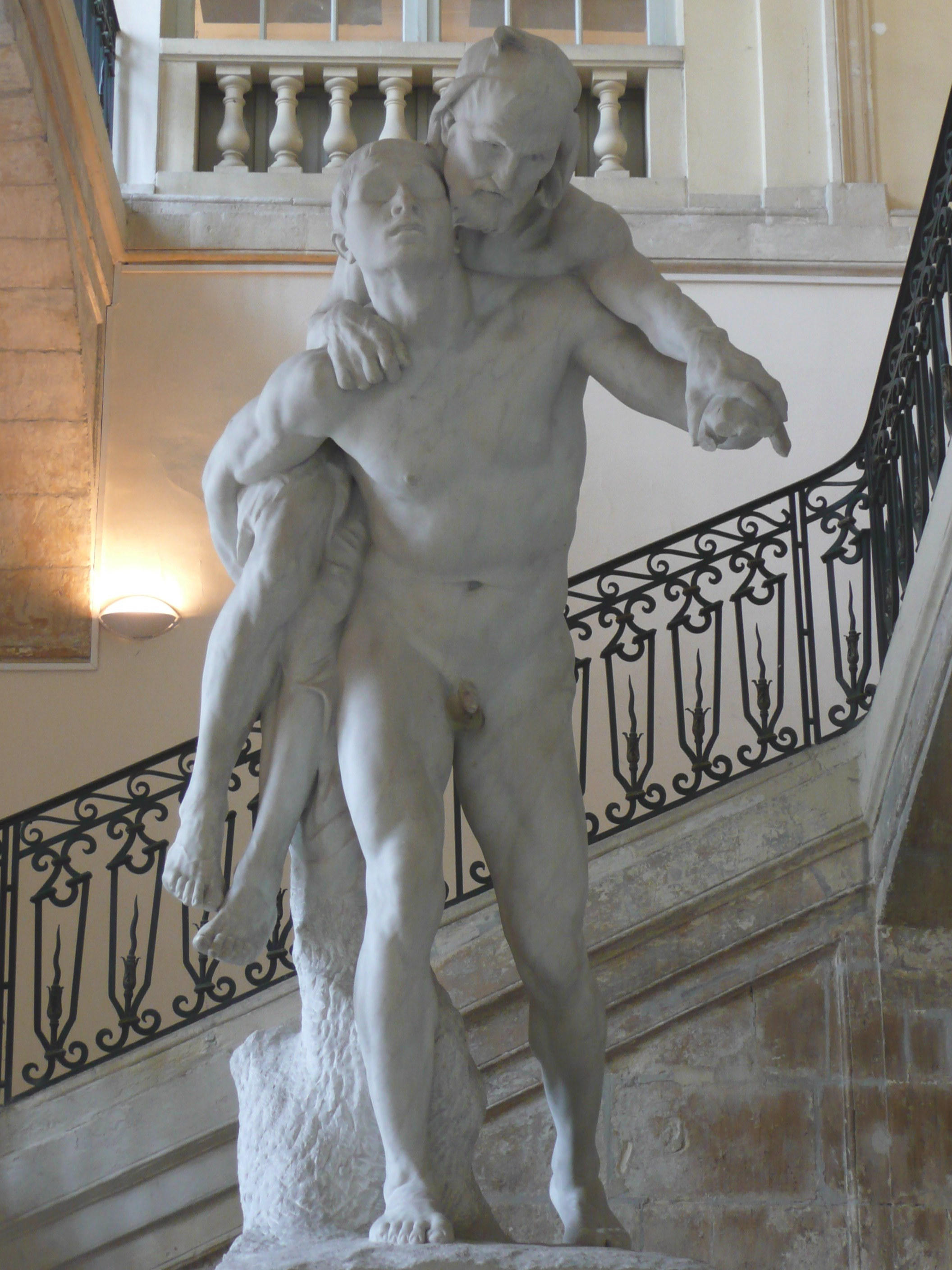
The marble version now in the episcopal palace of Arles

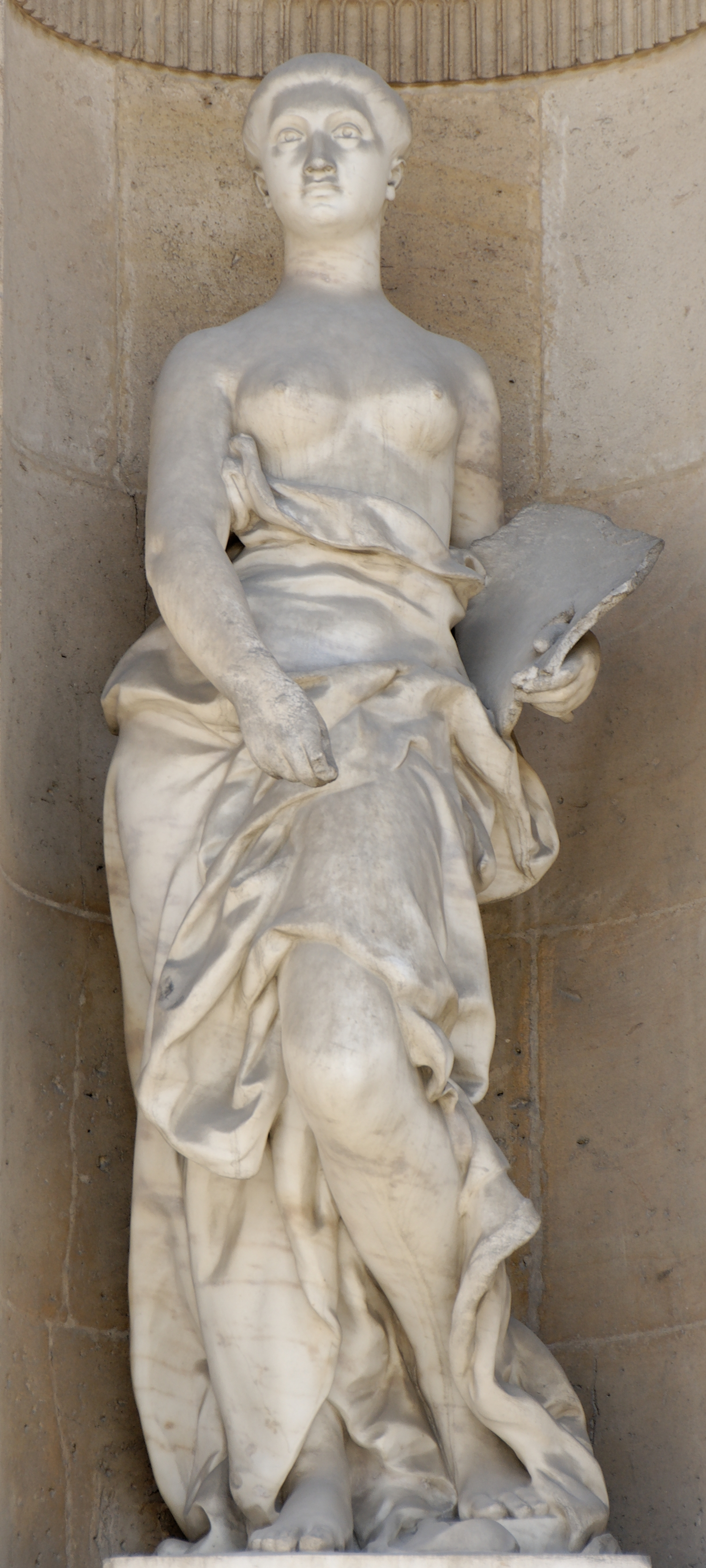
The figure of Painting in the Louvre Palace, Paris

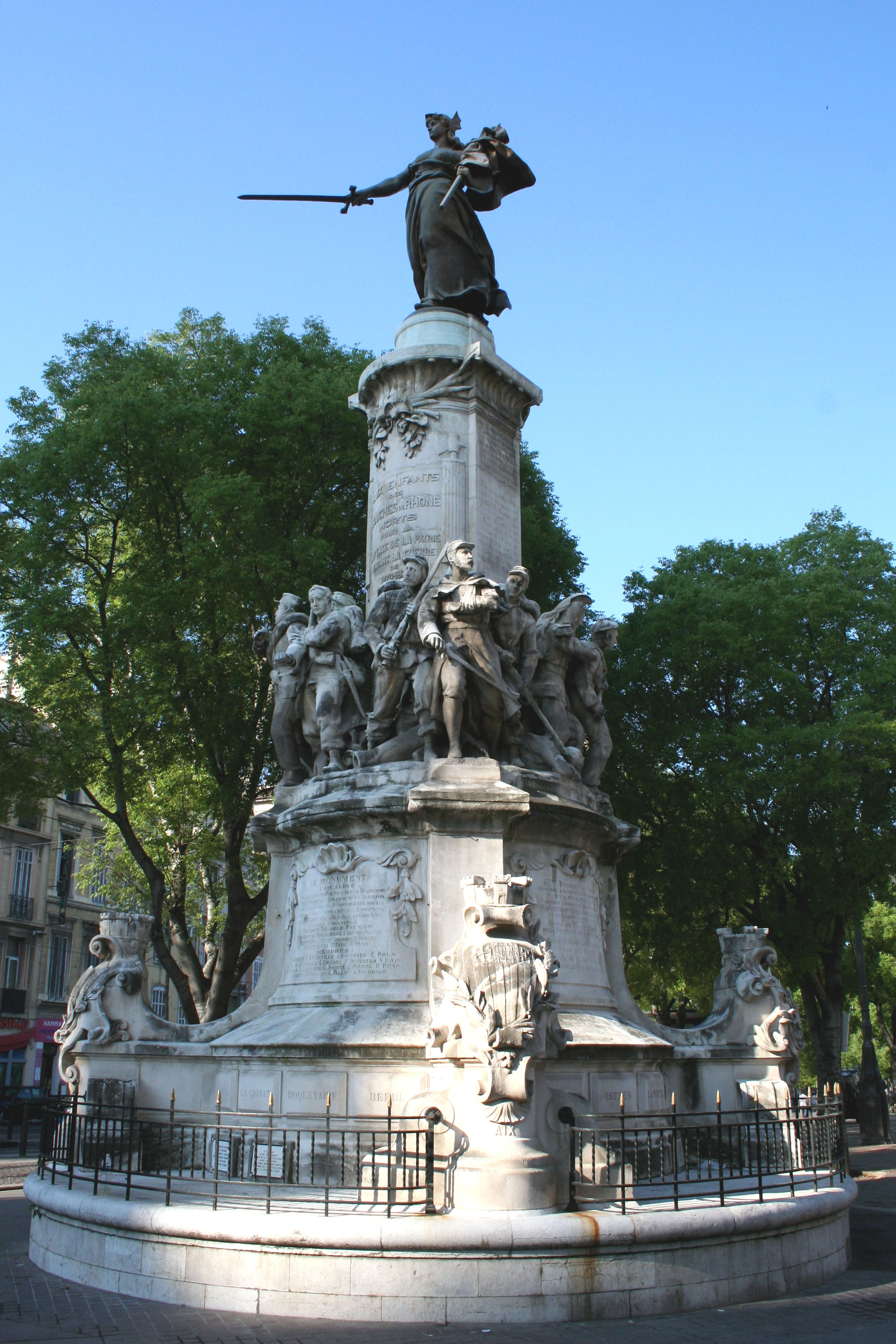
Turcan was responsible for the stone carving on the Marseille monument
