= The Blind Man and the Lame =

Fable

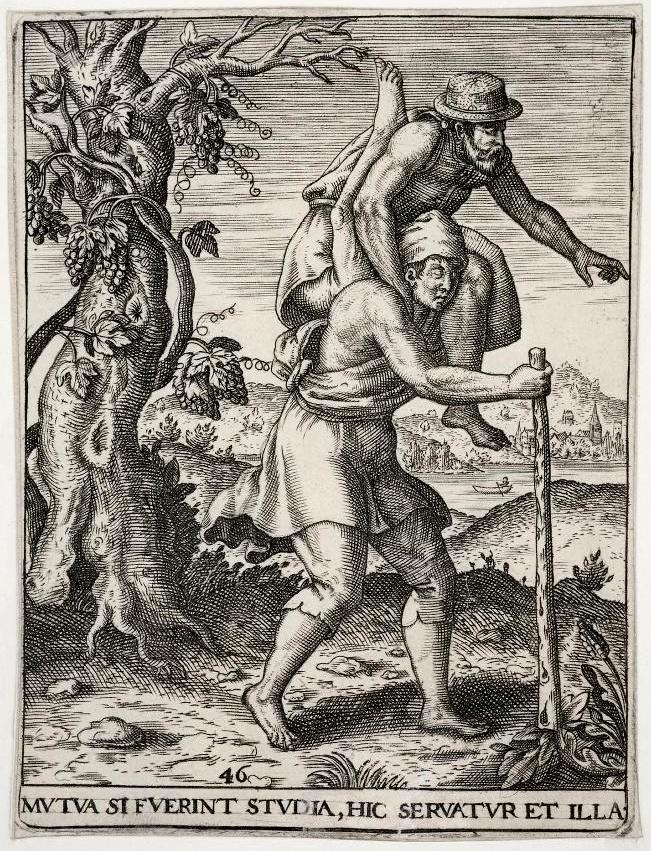
The 46th emblem from Johann Theodor de Bry's Emblemata saecularia with the theme of mutual support

"The Blind Man and the Lame" is a fable that recounts how two individuals collaborate in an effort to overcome their respective disabilities. The theme is first attested in Greek about the first century BCE. Stories with this feature occur in Asia, Europe and North America.

While visual representations were common in Europe from the 16th century, literary fables incorporating the theme only began to emerge during the 18th century and the story was mistakenly claimed to be one of Aesop's Fables.

The adaptation by Jean-Pierre Claris de Florian gave rise to the French idiom, "L'union de l'aveugle et le paralytique" ("the union of the blind man and the lame"), used ironically in reference to any unpromising partnership.

== Western Asian sources ==
A group of four epigrams in the Greek Anthology concern a blind man and a lame. Plato the Younger states the situation in two wittily contrasting lines:

A blind man carried a lame man on his back,
lending him his feet and borrowing from him his eyes.

The three others, who include Leonidas of Alexandria and Antiphilus of Byzantium, comment that by combining in this way the two make a perfect whole.

A West Asian story based on this trope is found in a pseudo-biblical document, the Apocryphon of Ezekiel, in which the two form a partnership to raid an orchard but claim their innocence by pointing out their disabilities. A variation of the story appears in the Jewish Talmud (Sanhedrin 91) and yet another is told in Islamic tradition as occurring during the boyhood of Jesus.

That the basic situation of the two helping each other was still known in Mediaeval times is suggested by its appearance among the Latin stories in the Gesta Romanorum at the turn of the 14th century. There an emperor declares a general feast and the lame man proposes the means of getting there to the blind. In the same century a paralytic boy mounted on a blind man's shoulders appears in a fresco in Lesnovo monastery, seeking a cure for their leprosy and suggesting a similar lesson in co-operation to overcome disabilities.

== European emblems ==
New life was given to the theme in the Renaissance when Andrea Alciato adapted the epigram by Leonidas into Latin and used it in his Book of Emblems (1534) to symbolise the theme of mutual support (mutuum auxilium). Other illustrated emblem books were to give the theme new interpretations. Jan Sadeler's Emblemata evangelica ad XII signa coelestia (Antwerp, 1585) pictures the pair crossing a plank bridge in the lower foreground of a majestic landscape, with Latin epigraphs exhorting charity. In the Emblemata saecularia (Oppenheim, 1596) of Johann Theodor de Bry, the illustration is dependent on Alciato's, particularly in the detail of the deformed leg; it also references the trope of the Elm and the Vine, another of Alciato's emblems. Combining the meaning of both, the print carries the epigraph Mutua si fuerint studia, hic servatur et illa, "Each is served where the objectives are common" (plate 46). The theme of mutual support was also carried forward into an 18th-century Low Countries print titled "The Allegory of Poverty", where the blind man carrying a cripple appears once again in a rural setting, with the addition of a huntsman defending a sleeping man from a feral dog.

== European fables ==
Though the theme was common enough in art, it does not appear in fable collections until Christian Fürchtegott Gellert included it in his verse collection Fabeln und Erzählungen (1746–1748). In this a blind man in the street asks a cripple for help and suggests how they can aid each other. The moral he draws is a wider one, that mutual support goes beyond charity to become a model for all of society:

The gifts of others thou hast not,
While others want what thou hast got;
And from this imperfection springs
The good that social virtue brings.

When Robert Dodsley adapted the story in the "Modern Fables" section of his Select fables of Esop and other fabulists (1754), he gave it a context from which later versions of the story were to develop. In his prose version, the two meet at "a difficult place in the road" and Dodsley follows Gellert in prefacing it with the comment that "the wants and weaknesses of individuals form the connections of society". Dodsley's version was later illustrated by Thomas Bewick and included in his Select Fables of Aesop (1818). Authors up to then had been careful to mention that their collections contained fables by Aesop "and others", but during the 19th century the story was often to be ascribed simply to Aesop.

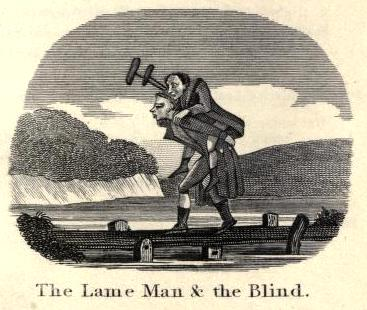
An illustration of the parable in Jefferys Taylor's Aesop in Rhyme, 1820

The nature of Dodsley's "difficult place" is redefined as "a dangerous place" in Jefferys Taylor's Aesop in Rhyme (1820), which the illustration reveals to be planks laid over a brook, not unlike the hazard over which the pair are crossing in Sadeler's emblem. But in Brooke Boothby's treatment of the story in his Fables and Satires (1809), the two meet at a ford and help each other across, as also happens in Marmarduke Park's Aesop in Rhyme or old friends in a new dress (Philadelphia 1852).

New forms of the fable were also to appear elsewhere in Europe. The French fabulist Jean-Pierre Claris de Florian gives his story of L'aveugle et le paralytique a completely different urban setting in Asia. The poem is prefaced by a saying of Confucius that the sharing of trouble lightens it and tells of two beggars who enter into a pact of mutual aid. There were two translations of this fable into English. The one by the Rev. William Lipscomb (1754–1842) ends with the sentiment "Your eyes to me their aid shall lend/ And I'll be hands and feet to you," suggesting that the author was acquainted with the story's origin in the epigrams from the Greek Anthology. The other translation, by the Canadian poet Sarah Ann Curzon, was more diffuse and appeared in 1887.

The skeptical Polish Bishop – later, Primate of Poland – Ignacy Krasicki, in his Fables and Parables (1779), gives the story a different ending. The blind man pays no heed to his lame guide, and after various mishaps they together fall over a precipice.

The theme of a lame beggar riding on the back of a blind man is taken to an even further remove in The Cat and the Moon (1924), a mask play by Irish poet W. B. Yeats. The argumentative pair search together for the holy well of Saint Colman, but never reconcile. Both are cured of their afflictions, but each in his own way.

In a Hopi traditional tale first collected in 1905, a similar pair are miraculously cured while together fleeing an earthquake. But there the similarity ends: these two act in perfect concord.

== Visual interpretations ==
Though Claris de Florian's version of the fable achieved lasting popularity, its Chinese setting seems to have been largely ignored by illustrators. Notable exceptions include Benjamin Rabier's 1906 broadsheet with the fable accompanied by Chinese-style illustrations and Armand Rapeño's illustration in a 1949 edition of Florian's fables. Even these, however, fall short of picturing an urban setting. The fable was also given a Japanese background in an edition illustrated by traditional woodcuts published from Tokyo in 1895.

Two later Belgian treatments are notable for being set in rural locations and compassionate treatment of the subject. Eugene Laermans varies the scene by picturing the pair side by side as they cross a stone bridge, the blind man with a cane in his right hand, the lame with a crutch in his left and his own right hand hooked through the other's arm. The Symbolist Anto Carte's painting of 1926–1930 places the pair in a Brabant landscape with the recognisable spire of the church at Ohain downslope. It was this scene which was subsequently reused on a 1954 set of Belgian charity stamps.

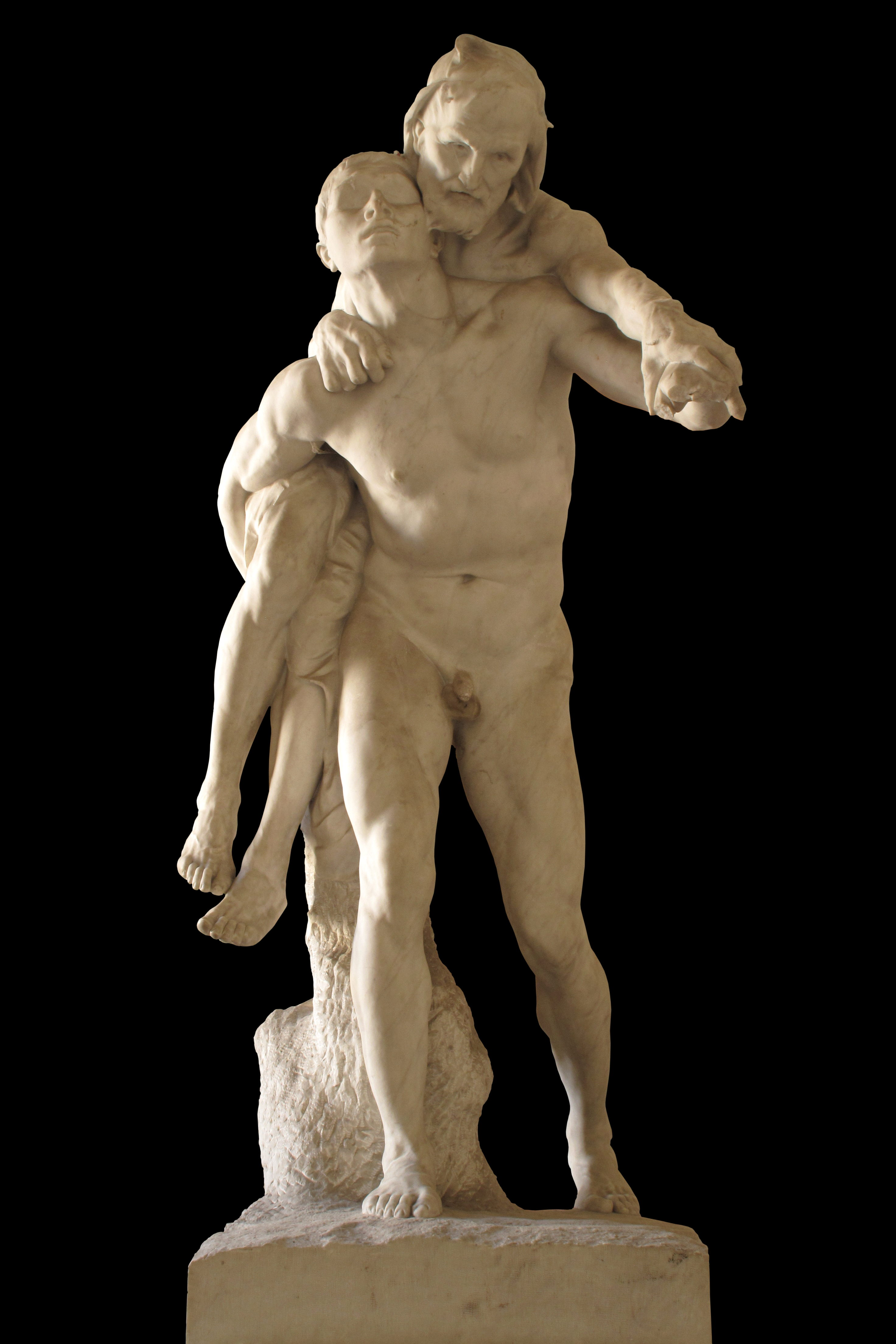
Turcan's 1883 rendering of the fable

Previously there had been several compassionate treatments in French art exhibited over the last quarter of the 19th century. Auguste-Barthélemy Glaize's painting for the 1877 Salon was notable enough to be made part of the French exhibit at the World's Columbian Exposition of 1893 and his own lithograph of it appeared in the programme. A contemporary account describes it as "One of the largest paintings ... and among the best of its kind. With staff in hand, striding vigorously over a rough country road, a man with sightless orbs is bearing on his back one stricken and wasted by paralysis, whose piercing and lustrous gaze gives stronger accentuation to the theme".

In the 1883 Salon there were no less than three statues of L'aveugle et le paralytique on show. The most celebrated was by Jean Turcan, whose plaster model of the subject received a first class medal. Subsequently, the French state arranged for him to carve it in marble and this version was exhibited at the 1888 Salon, when it received a medal of honour. The next year it was given a further prize at the Universal Exhibition and afterwards was placed in the Musée du Luxembourg. In 1927 it was moved to Arles, Turcan's birthplace, where it has remained. A bronze version was also created for Marseille, the city that had provided him with a bursary to study sculpture, but this was to be melted down during World War II. When the marble statue was photographed by the state in 1888, the fable was attributed to Aesop, not Florian.

A similar fate was to come to the bronze statues of the two other exhibits at the 1883 Salon. Gustave Michel received a travel bursary for his plaster model. The bronze version was located in Paris in the Square Tenon (now the Square Edouard Vaillant) and was melted down during World War II. The statue by Joseph Carlier was placed in a public park in his native Cambrai, a town occupied by the Germans during World War I. It was therefore requisitioned and melted down even earlier. Turcan's marble statue is therefore the sole survivor of this period and is representative of what were somewhat similar designs.

In Germany too there were compassionate treatments of the theme by Expressionist Christian artists, both dating from 1919. Ernst Gerlach produced his Der Blind und Der Lahme as a stucco relief of two peasants. Richard Seewald published his woodcut in the Bavarian magazine Münchner Blätter für Dichtung und Graphik. In it the motif of crossing a river on a narrow plank returns and an angel hovering in the background underlines the earlier Christian connotation of the emblem tradition.

== Adaptations ==
Honoré Daumier used Florian's fable for purposes of political satire in a caricature, "Blind system and paralytic diplomacy", published in Le Charivari in 1834. It pictures King Louis Philippe staggering under the weight of Talleyrand. Such treatment contributed to the emergence of the French idiom, "L'union de l'aveugle et le paralytique" ("the union of the blind man and the lame"), that drew on Florian's poem but was used ironically in reference to any unpromising partnership. Another such appears in a poster by Jules Grandjouan (1875–1968) with reference to conflicting interests in the Edouard Herriot government of 1924.

The situation was used to more positive effect during World War I to illustrate the care of soldiers for each other on the battlefield. Lucien Jonas pictured such a scene under the heading of Devotion in his album Les Grandes Vertus Françaises, drawing on Turcan's statue for the detail of the wounded soldier holding the blinded soldier's arm to guide him. The theme was repeated on a contemporary Belgian lapel badge inscribed on the back with Hommage aux soldats invalides (Hommage to invalided soldiers).

Turcan's statue also formed the basis for a satirical photomontage during World War II. This depicted Joseph Stalin riding on the back of Adolf Hitler and appeared in the magazine Marianne under the signature Marinus, the nom de plume of the Danish Jacob Kjeldgaard.

== See also ==
- Holism
