= Le Bon Ménage =

- Written by: Jean-Pierre Claris de Florian
- Characters: Arlequin; Argentine; Rosalba; Mezzetin two children
- Original language: French
- Series: The Arlequinades
- Genre: comedy
- Setting: Arlequin's home in Bergamo, Italy

Premiere
- Date premiered: 1782
- Place premiered: France

Le Bon Ménage (English: The Good Household) is a one act comedy by Jean-Pierre Claris de Florian. It was first performed by the Comédie Italienne in 1782. Le Bon ménage is the second of a trilogy of plays called "The Arlequinades" that tell the story of Arlequin, his wife Argentine, and later, their children. The other two plays in the series are Les Deux Billets and Le Bon Père.

== Plot summary ==
Following their adventure in Les Deux Billets, Arlequin and Argentine have married, moved to Bergamo, and had two sons. The play opens with Argentine reading the Bible to her children. Rosalba, her mistress, enters. For the past three months, Argentine has been serving as a go-between for Rosalba and her husband, Lélio, since Rosalba's father forbade the marriage. Lélio has finally arrived in Bergamo, and Rosalba asks Argentine to visit him outside the city to tell him to wait there.

After Rosalba leaves, Arlequin arrives. Argentine tells Arlequin that she needs to run an errand for Rosalba but does not explain herself because she promised Rosalba that she would tell no one, even Arlequin. While Argentine is gone, Mezzetin arrives with a letter from Lélio to Rosalba, but as part of the secret, he has written Argentine's name on the outside. Mezzetin mistakes Arlequin for Argentine's servant and tells him that he thinks Lélio is having an affair with her. Arlequin reads the letter and assumes that Argentine is cheating on him. He confronts her when she returns to the house, but she refuses to tell Arlequin what she was doing and asks him instead to trust her. He leaves to tell Rosalba's father that Argentine was having an affair.

Rosalba comes to Argentine's house, and after hearing what has happened, she runs to her father's house to explain. Arlequin returns, and after again pleading with him to trust her, Argentine successfully convinces Arlequin to wait and see what happens. Rosalba enters to say that she confessed everything to her father, and that her father forgave her.

== Characters ==
- Arlequin, a resident of Bergamo
- Argentine, Arlequin's wife
- Rosalba, Argentine's mistress
- Mezzetin, Lélio's page
- Two children
