= J. Hector St. John de Crèvecœur =

French-American author, diplomat, and farmer (1735–1813)

J. Hector St. John de Crèvecoeur
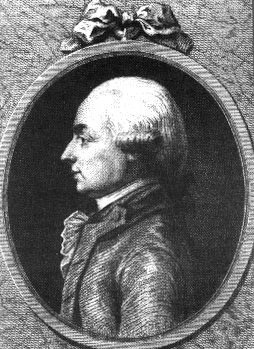
- Born: January 31, 1735; Caen, France
- Died: November 12, 1813 (aged 77); Sarcelles, France
- Other name: Michel Guillaume Jean de Crèvecoeur
- Occupation: Writer
- Known for: Pro-American writings during the time of the American Revolution
- Spouse: Mehitable Tippet

Michel Guillaume Jean de Crèvecœur (French pronunciation: [miʃɛl ɡijom ʒɑ̃ də kʁɛvkœʁ]; December 31, 1735 – November 12, 1813), naturalized in New York as John Hector St. John, was a French-American writer, diplomat, and farmer.

== Biography ==
Crèvecœur was born on December 31, 1735, in Caen, Province of Normandy, France, to the Count and Countess of Crèvecœur. He was educated by Jesuits at Caen's Collège Royal-Bourbon, and was sent to live with relatives in Salisbury around 1751. In 1755 he migrated to New France, in North America. There, he served in the French and Indian War under Montcalm in the La Sarre Regiment, where he was a cartographer and rose to the rank of lieutenant. After the French defeat at the Battle of the Plains of Abraham of in 1759, he moved to the Province of New York, where he acquired British citizenship and adopted the anglicized name of John Hector St. John; in 1770 he married an American woman, Mehitable Tippet, the daughter of a New York merchant. He bought a sizable farm in the Greycourt area of Chester, New York, a small town in Orange County. He named his farm "Pine Hill" and prospered as a farmer. He also traveled about, working as a surveyor. He started writing about life in the American colonies and the emergence of an American society.

In 1779, during the American Revolutionary War, Crèvecœur tried to leave the country to return to France because of the faltering health of his father. Accompanied by his son, he entered British-occupied New York City, where he was imprisoned as a suspected American spy for three months. Eventually, he was released and sailed for England, but was shipwrecked off the coast of Ireland. From England, he sailed to France, where he was briefly reunited with his father. After spending some time recovering at the family estate, he visited Paris and the salon of Sophie d'Houdetot.

=== Author ===
In 1782 in London, he published a volume of narrative essays entitled Letters from an American Farmer. The book quickly became the first literary success by an American author in Europe and turned Crèvecœur into a celebrated figure. He was the first writer to describe to Europeans the life on the American frontier and to explore the concept of the American Dream. He used many American English terms portraying American society as characterized by the principles of equal opportunity and self-determination. His work provided useful information and understanding of the "New World" that helped create an American identity in the minds of Europeans by describing an entire country, rather than another regional colony. His writing celebrated American ingenuity and the uncomplicated lifestyle. It described the acceptance of religious diversity in a society being created from a variety of ethnic and cultural backgrounds. He applied the Latin maxim "Ubi panis ibi patria" (Where there is bread, there is my country) to early American settlers. He once praised the middle colonies for "fair cities, substantial villages, extensive fields... decent houses, good roads, orchards, meadows, and bridges, where an hundred years ago all was wild, woody, and uncultivated."

The original edition, published near the end of the American Revolutionary War, was rather selective in the letters that were included, omitting those that were negative or critical. Norman A. Plotkin argues that "it was intended to serve the English Whig cause by fostering an atmosphere conducive to reconciliation." The book excluded all but one of the letters that were written after the beginning of the war, as well as earlier ones that were more critical. Crèvecœur himself sympathized with the Whig cause. His wife's family remained loyal to the Crown and later fled to Nova Scotia. With regard to French politics, Crèvecœur was a liberal and a follower of the philosophes and dedicated his book to Abbé Raynal, who he said "viewed these provinces of North America in their true light, as the asylum of freedom; as the cradle of future nations, and the refuge of distressed Europeans." Plotkin notes that "extremists in the American colonies who violated this principle, incurred Crèvecœur's harshest criticism, although the severest of these criticisms were considered unsuitable for publication at the time."

In 1883, his great-grandson, Robert de Crèvecœur, published a biography for which he used previously unpublished letters and manuscripts passed down by the family. Although it received little notice in France, its existence came to the attention of W. P. Trent of Columbia University, who in 1904 published a reprint of Letters of an American Farmer. In 1916, Crèvecœur's first American biographer, Julia Post Mitchell, who had access to all the manuscripts, made a more balanced assessment and wrote that Crèvecœur addressed "problems in political economy which European governments were trying in vain to solve." He was "illustrating his theories from American conditions" and was not just "a garruluous apologist of American life." The additional manuscripts were published in 1925.

=== Diplomat ===
The success of his book in France had led to his being taken up by an influential circle, and he was appointed the French consul for New York, including the areas of New Jersey and Connecticut. Crèvecœur returned to New York City as the newly appointed French consul in November 1783. Anxious to be reunited with his family, he learned that his farm had been destroyed in an Indian raid, his wife was dead, and his two younger children missing. He stayed in the house of his friend William Seton, who, as the last royal public notary for the City and province of New York, had helped to secure his release in 1780 from the prison he was kept in. Principal of the import-export mercantile firm the William Seton Company, Seton helped Crèvecœur locate his children, who were safe and living with a family in Boston. The following spring, Crèvecœur reunited with his children. For most of the 1780s, he lived in New York City.

==== St. Peter's, New York ====
At that time, New York City was the national capital, and most of the resident Catholics were connected to the diplomatic corps. Initially, they met for services at the home of the Spanish consul. Their numbers increased with seafaring people, merchants, emigrants from the Spanish West Indies, and a few Acadians. They then rented space at Vauxhall Gardens, a garden and entertainment venue located along the North River on Greenwich Street between Warren and Chambers Streets. In 1785, Portuguese Consul Jose Roiz Silva, Spanish Consul Tomas Stoughton and others sought to rent the vacant Exchange Building and deemed Crèvecœur the best one to make the approach.

Although Crèvecœur was relatively indifferent to religion, he was sympathetic to the idea of liberty of conscience and a friend of Lafayette. When the proposal was rejected, Crèvecœur was insulted and became very active in working for the establishment of the first Catholic church in the city. He later served as president of the first Board of Trustees of St. Peter's Church, on Barclay Street.

=== Later life ===
In 1784, he published a two-volume version of his Letters from an American Farmer, enlarged and completely rewritten in French. A three-volume version followed in 1787. Both his English and his French books were translated into several other European languages and widely disseminated throughout Europe. For many years, Crèvecœur was identified by European readers with his fictional narrator, James, the "American farmer," and held in high esteem by readers and fellow writers across Europe. When he published another three-volume work in 1801, Voyage dans la Haute-Pensylvanie et dans l'état de New-York, his fame had faded and the damages of the French Revolution and its aftermath had made people less interested in the United States. His book was ignored. An abbreviated German translation appeared the following year. An English translation was not published until 1964. Much of Crèvecœur's best work has been published posthumously, most recently as More Letters from the American Farmer: An edition of the Essays in English Left Unpublished by Crèvecœur, edited by Dennis D. Moore (Athens, Georgia: University of Georgia Press, 1995).

Particularly concerned about the condition of slaves, he joined the Société des Amis des Noirs (Society of the Friends of the Blacks), founded in Paris. Crèvecœur was elected to the American Philosophical Society in 1789. In 1789, during a stay in France, he was trapped by the political upheaval that was quickly turning into the French Revolution. At risk as an aristocrat, he went into hiding and secretly tried to gain passage to the United States. The necessary papers were finally delivered to him by the new American ambassador to France, James Monroe, at the end of his life. Crèvecœur returned to France and settled permanently on land that he inherited from his father. On November 12, 1813, he died in Sarcelles, Île-de-France, France. The town of St. Johnsbury, Vermont, is named after him, as suggested by Ethan Allen.

== Primary works ==
- Letters from an American Farmer: Describing Certain Provincial Situations, Manners, and Customs, Not Generally Known; and Conveying Some Idea of the Late and Present Interior Circumstances of the British Colonies of North America, 1782.
- Letters from an American Farmer, written to W.S. (William Seton), squire, from the year 1770 to 1781, translated from English by *** (Lettres d'un cultivateur américain : écrites à W. S. (William Seton), écuyer, depuis l'année 1770 jusqu'à 1781, traduites de l'anglois par ***), 1784.
- Memoire sur le Commerce Entre la France et les États-Unis D'Amerique, 1784 (manuscript rests in the U.S. Embassy, Paris).
- Eighteenth-Century Travels in Pennsylvania and New York (Voyage dans la Haute-Pensylvanie et dans l'état de New-York), 1801.
- Sketches of the Eighteenth Century America: More "Letters From an American Farmer", probably written between 1770 and 1774, first published 1925.

== Selected criticism ==
- David Eisermann: Crèvecoeur oder Die Erfindung Amerikas, Rheinbach-Merzbach: CMZ-Verlag, 1985
- Thomas Hallock, From the Fallen Tree: Frontier Narratives, Environmental Politics, and the Roots of a National Pastoral, Chapel Hill: University of North Carolina Press, 2003
- Daniel Patterson, ed. Early American Writers: A Biographical Encyclopedia, Westport: Greenwood Press, 2008. "J. Hector St. John de Crevecoeur." Thomas Patchell. 96–104.
- Norman A. Plotkin, "Saint-John de Crevecoeur Rediscovered: Critic or Paneygyrist?", French Historical Studies, vol. 3, no. 3 (Spring 1964), pp. 390–404. JSTOR 285950.
- Paul P. Reuben. "Chapter 2: Early American Literature: 1700–1800 – St. Jean De Crevecoeur", PAL: Perspectives in American Literature – A Research and Reference Guide
- Alan Taylor, "The American Beginning: The Dark Side of Letters from an American Farmer," New Republic July 18, 2013

== Sources ==
- Gay Wilson Allen and Roger Asselineau, An American Farmer: The Life of St. John de Crevecoeur, New York: Viking Penguin, 1987
- J. Hector St. John. de Crevecoeur, Letters From an American Farmer and Other Essays edited by Dennis D. Moore (Harvard University Press; 2012) 372 pages; combines an edition of the famous 1782 work and his other writings
