= Grace Kennedy (writer) =

Scottish author

Grace Kennedy (1782 – 28 February 1825) was a Scottish writer. She was the fourth daughter of Robert Kennedy of Pinmore, county Ayr, and Robina, daughter of John Vans Agnew, of Barnbarrow, county Galloway. She was born at Pinmore in Ayrshire, but at an early age moved to Edinburgh. She wrote novels of a religious tendency which were very popular in their day. By 1920, they were very little read. She is best known as the author of Father Clement (1823), an anti-Roman Catholic novel, which ran through some dozen editions and was translated into most of the languages of Europe. She was writing Philip Colville, a Covenanter's Story when she died in 1825. A collection of her works in six volumes appeared at Edinburgh in 1827, and a German translation of them, Sämmtliche Werke, in Bielefeld in 1838 and another one in 1842.

== Publications ==
- The Decision; or religioin must be all, or is nothing (1821): play, not produced
- Profession is not Principle (1822)
- Jessy Allan, or The Lame Girl (1822)
- Father Clement (1823)
- Anna Ross (1824)
- Andrew Campbell's Visit to his Irish Cousins (1824)
- The Word of God and the Word of Man (1824)
- Dunallan (second edition, 1825)
- Philip Colville (unfinished, 1825)
