= Jean-Pierre Claris de Florian =

French poet and novelist (1755-1794)

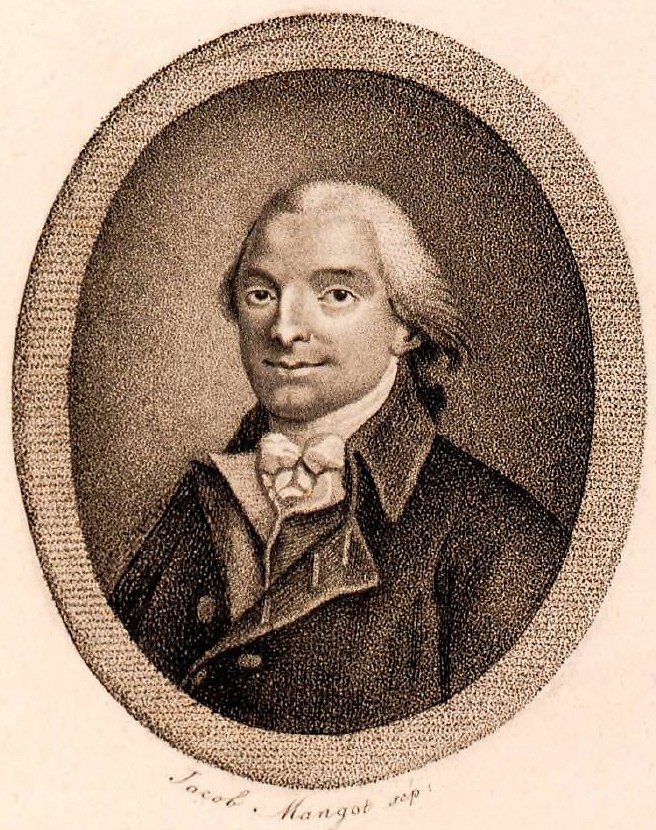
- Portrait of de Florian, c. 1800
- Born: 6 March 1755; Sauve, Gard, France
- Died: 13 September 1794 (aged 39); Sceaux, Hauts-de-Seine, France
- Occupations: Poet; novelist

Jean-Pierre Claris de Florian (6 March 1755 – 13 September 1794) was a French poet, novelist and fabulist. He is best known for writing the poem Plaisir d'amour as part of his novel, Célestine, which was later set to the music composed by Jean-Paul-Égide Martini. The song received popularity after composer Hector Berlioz arranged it for orchestra. Additionally, the song formed the basis of Elvis Presley's iconic hit Can't Help Falling in Love (1961). Throughout his lifetime, de Florian was well known for his fables, which have been reprinted numerous times, as well as his plays.

== Life ==
Jean-Pierre Claris de Florian was born on 6 March 1755 in the château de Florian, located near Sauve, Gard, France. His mother, Gilette de Salgues (originally from Spain), died when he was a child. He was then brought up by his grandfather and studied at St. Hippolyte. His uncle and guardian, the Marquis of Florian, who had married a niece of Voltaire, introduced him at the château de Ferney, and in 1768 he became page at Anet in the household of the Duc de Penthièvre, who remained his friend throughout his life. Having studied for some time at the artillery school at Bapaume he obtained a captain's commission in the dragoon regiment of Penthièvre from his patron.

He left the army soon after, began to write comedies, and was elected to the L'Académie Française in 1788. At the outbreak of the French Revolution, he retired to Sceaux but was soon discovered and imprisoned. Although Robespierre's death spared him, he died from tuberculosis a few months later on 13 September 1794 while still in prison.

== Works ==
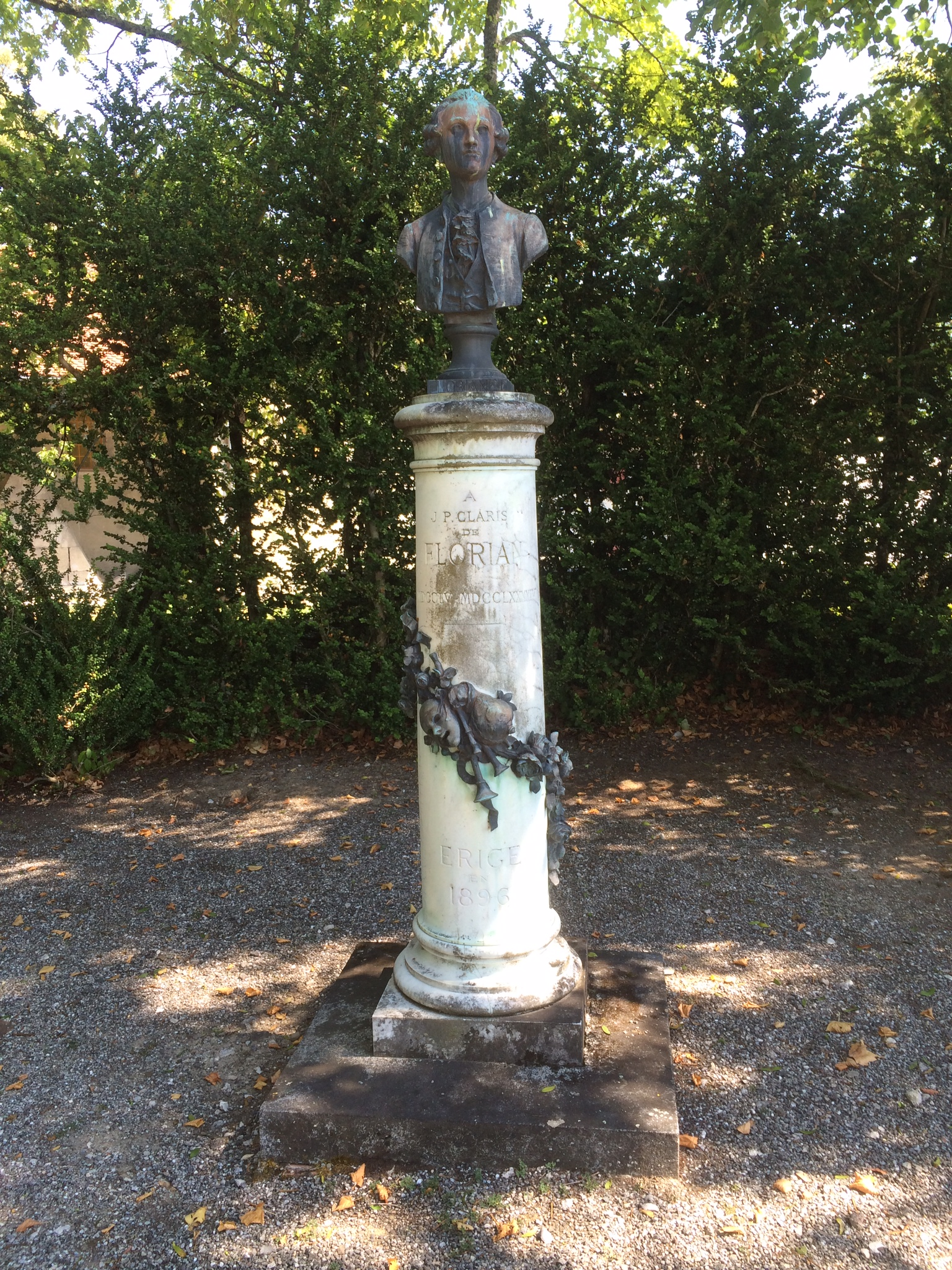
Column supporting bust of Jean-Pierre Claris de Florian on the grounds of Voltaire's house at Ferney-Voltaire

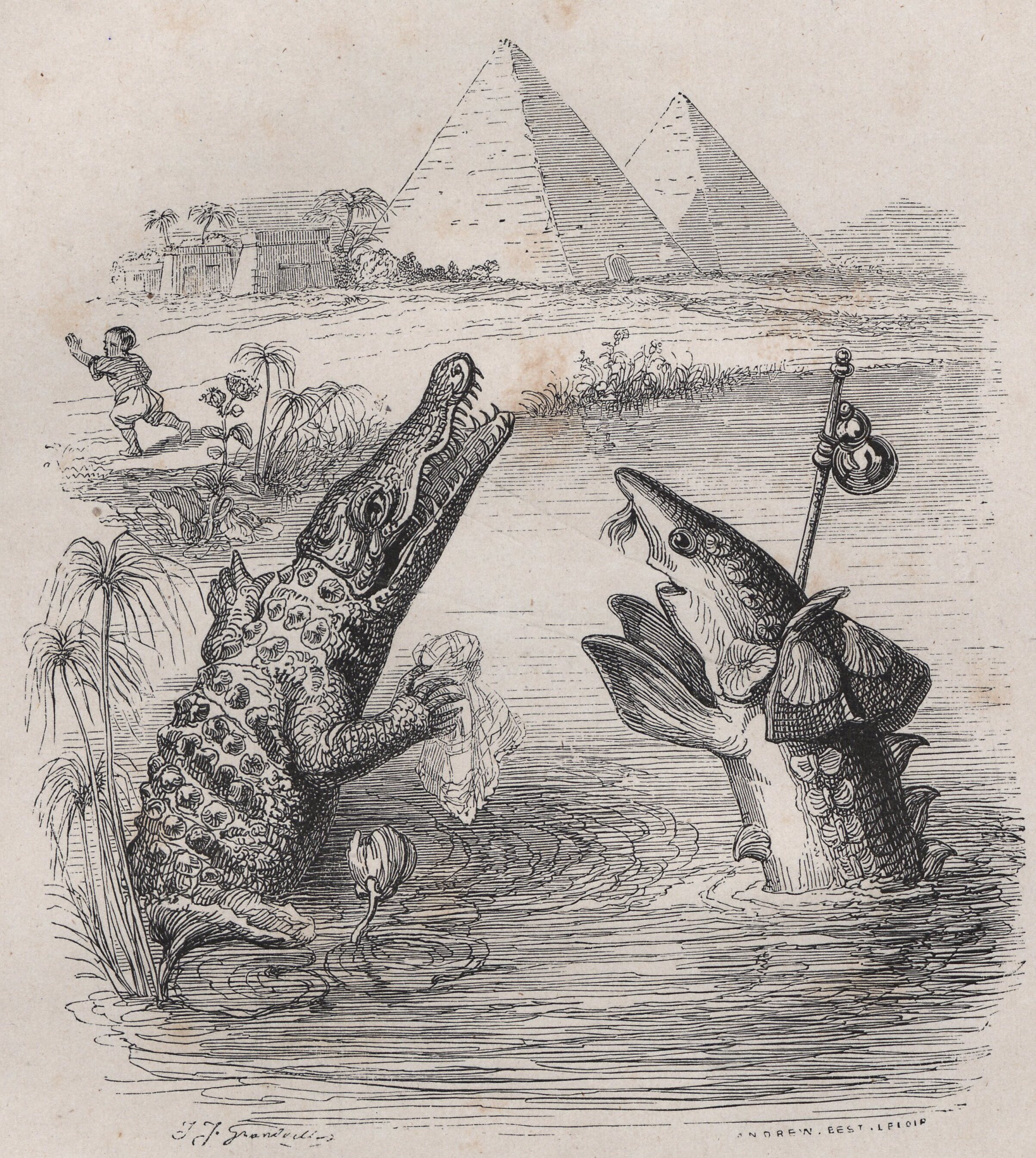
Illustration for The Crocodile and the Sturgeon, by J. J. Grandville, (ca. 1842) from a 1845 edition of Fables de Florian, published by Garniers Brothers, Paris

To later readers, Florian was chiefly known as the author of pretty fables well suited as reading for the young, but his contemporaries praised him also for his poetical and pastoral novels. He also abridged and imitated the works of Cervantes.

Florian's first literary efforts were comedies; his verse epistle Voltaire et le serf du Mont Jura and an eclogue Ruth were recognized by L'Académie Française in 1782 and 1784 respectively. In 1782 also he produced a one-act prose comedy, Le Bon Ménage; then, in 1783, Galatie, a romantic tale in imitation of the Galatea of Cervantes, appeared. Other short tales and comedies followed, and in 1786 Numa Pompilius, an undisguised imitation of Fénelon's Telémaque, was distributed.

In 1788, he became a member of L'Académie Française, and published Estelle, a pastoral in the same class as Galatie. Estelle was followed by L'Histoire des Maures d'Espagne in 1791, and then another romance, Gonzalve de Cordoue, in 1792. One of his more well-known works, particularly amongst children, Fables de Florian appeared in 1802. Among his posthumous works are La Jeunesse de Florian, ou Mémoires d'un Jeune Espagnol (1807), and an abridgment (1809) of Don Quixote, which, though far from being a correct representation of the original, had great success.

Florian imitated Salomon Gessner, the Swiss idyllist, and his style had all the artificial delicacy and sentimentality of the Gessnerian school. Perhaps the nearest example of the class in English literature was afforded by John Wilson's Lights and Shadows of Scottish Life (written as Christopher North). Among the best of his fables were reckoned The Monkey showing the Magic Lantern, The Blind Man and the Paralytic, and The Monkeys and the Leopard.

=== Selected works ===
Fables

- The Blind man and the Paralytic
- The Monkey and the Magic Lantern
- The Monkeys and the Leopard
- The Fable and the Truth
- The Crocodile and the Sturgeon
- The Child and the Mirror
- The Old Tree and the Gardener
- The Nightingale and the Prince
- The Two Travelers
- The Cricket (also known as True Happiness)

Theatre

- Les Deux Billets (1779)
- Le Bon Ménage (1782)
- Le Bon Père (1784)
- Les Jumeaux de Bergame (1782)

Other

- Pastorales
- Variétés et contes en vers
- Plaisir d'amour, a song
- Mémoires d'un jeune Espagnol

== Famous verses ==
Florian wrote a collection of fables from which several expressions have passed into colloquial French:

- Pour vivre heureux, vivons cachés: "In order to live happily, live hidden"
- Chacun son métier, les vaches seront bien gardées: "To each his occupation, and the cows will be well guarded."
- Rira bien qui rira le dernier: "He who laughs last laughs best."

The expression éclairer la lanterne ("light the lantern") is also drawn from Florian's fables.

His most famous verse is Plaisir d'amour, a poem he put in his story Celestine. The verse became a song which has survived to the 21st century. (See, for example, versions by Charlotte Church (2001) and Andrea Botticelli (2002).)

== Heraldry ==
Blason: Or an eagle sable on a chief azure a sun or (the coat of arms of his birthplace of Florian) to which the eagle looks (for difference).

== Bibliography ==
- Florian, Fables, edited by Jean-Noël Pascal, Ferney-Voltaire, Centre international d'étude du XVIIIe siècle, 2005, ISBN 2-84559-032-6
- Florian le fabuliste by Jean-Luc Gourdin, biography, Ramsay, 2003.
- Florian, l'homme à fables, illustrated by Jean-François Ramirez, collection of 40 fables selected by Florian Mantione, 1997, Edition Athéna-Paris

== See also ==
- Fable
