= Letters from an American Farmer =

Book by J. Hector St. John de Crèvecœur

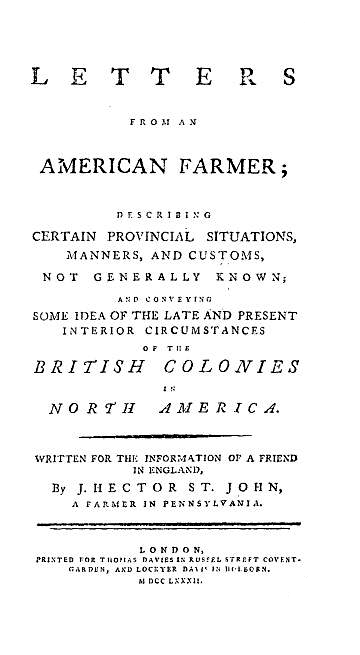
- Title page of the second edition.
- Author: J. Hector St. John de Crèvecœur
- Language: English
- Genre: Travel literature, Novel
- Publisher: Davies & Davis
- Publication date: 1782
- Publication place: United Kingdom

Letters from an American Farmer is a series of letters written by French American writer J. Hector St. John de Crèvecœur, first published in 1782. The considerably longer title under which it was originally published is Letters from an American Farmer; Describing Certain Provincial Situations, Manners, and Customs not Generally Known; and Conveying Some Idea of the Late and Present Interior Circumstances of the British Colonies in North America. The twelve letters cover a wide range of topics, from the emergence of an American identity to the slave trade.

Crèvecœur wrote Letters during a period of seven years prior to the American Revolutionary War, while farming in the fertile Greycourt, blackdirt region of Chester, a small town in Orange County, New York. It is told from the viewpoint of a fictional narrator in correspondence with an English gentleman, and each letter concerns a different aspect of life or location in the British colonies of America. The work incorporates a number of styles and genres, including documentary, as well as sociological observations.

Although only moderately successful in America, Letters was immediately popular in Europe upon its publication in 1782. Prompted by high demand, Crèvecœur produced an expanded French version that was published two years later. The work is recognized as being one of the first in the canon of American literature, and has influenced a diverse range of subsequent works.

== Biographical background ==
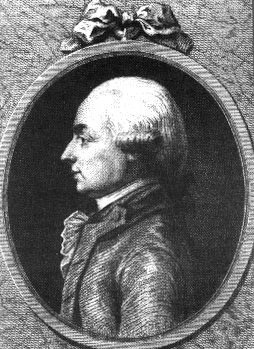
J. Hector St. John de Crèvecœur

Born in Caen, Normandy to an aristocratic family, Michel-Guillaume Hector St. John de Crèvecœur received a Jesuit education at the Jesuit Collège Royal de Bourbon. In 1754, having left school, Crèvecœur visited relatives in England where he became engaged; this visit would mark the beginning of a lifelong admiration for the culture and politics of the country. Shortly after this, possibly due to the death of his fiancée, he joined a French regiment in Canada engaged in the French and Indian War (1754–1763). After being wounded in the Battle of the Plains of Abraham (1759), Crèvecœur resigned his commission and began traveling widely across Pennsylvania and New York.

In 1765, Crèvecœur became an official resident of New York and naturalized as a British subject, adopting the name J. Hector St. John. After working as a surveyor and trader during the subsequent four years, in which he traveled extensively, he purchased farmland in Orange County, New York and married Mehitabel Tippett. During the following seven years, Crèvecœur wrote Letters from an American Farmer and corresponded with William Seton (possibly referenced in the book as "Mr F. B.", and to whom the French edition was dedicated).

As local hostilities between the loyalists and revolutionaries escalated in the build-up to the American Revolutionary War (1775–1783), Crèvecœur decided to return to France; scholars have suggested that he did so in order to secure his legal claim to his patrimony. Upon his arrival in New York City in 1778, Crèvecœur found himself under suspicion of being a Revolutionary spy and was detained; whilst in detention, he suffered a nervous collapse. He was released to travel in September 1780, and traveled to London after landing in Ireland. There, he sold the manuscript of Letters to publishers Davies & Davis before leaving for France.

== Summary ==
- Letter I: "Introduction" — Introduction of the fictional persona of James, an American farmer, and the commencement of his correspondence via letters with 'Mr F. B.', an English gentleman. Doubting his writing abilities, he receives advice from his wife and the local minister.
- Letter II: "On the Situation, Feelings, and Pleasures of an American Farmer" — Description of the creatures, plants, and activities on and around the farm owned by James. It comments on the differences between the American model of society and that of European countries.
- Letter III: "What Is an American?" — Comparison between the physical environment and the societies that emerge from it. Explores the conditions and aspects of the new American country and what constitutes the identity of its citizens.
- Letters IV – VIII — Widely referred to as the "Nantucket sequence" or "Nantucket letters". These letters describe various aspects of the Quaker society on the island of Nantucket and Martha's Vineyard:
  - Letter IV: "Description of the island of Nantucket; with the manners, customs, policy and trade, of the inhabitants"
  - Letter V: "Customary education and employment of the inhabitants of Nantucket"
  - Letter VI: "Description of the island of Martha's Vineyard, and of the whale-fishery"
  - Letter VII: "Manners and customs at Nantucket"
  - Letter VIII: "Peculiar customs at Nantucket"
- Letter IX: "Description of Charles Town; Thoughts on Slavery; on Physical Evil; a Melancholy Scene" — An account of "Charles Town" (now Charleston), particularly on the institution of slavery in the town and in the Southern United States. It argues about the destruction that revolves around the slave-master relationships and makes an appeal to the North, in particular, that slavery is a truly evil practice in the midst of the new nation of America.
- Letter X: "On snakes and on the humming-bird" — Extensive detailing of a wide variety of snakes, including the cultural practices surrounding them; it also mentions their habits and stories that have been told in America, warning people about certain ones. At the end of this letter, the discussion turns to the hummingbirds found around James' land and their habits and varieties.
- Letter XI: "From Mr. Iw——n Al——z, a Russian gentleman describing a visit he paid, at my request, to Mr. John Bertram, the celebrated Pennsylvanian botanist" — Narrated by a Russian gentleman, describing his visit to the famous Pennsylvanian botanist, Mr. John Bertram. The narrator tells of the new methods of fertilizing and irrigation that Bertram has invented and used on his own plants.
- Letter XII: "Distresses of a Frontier Man" — Description of the impending American Revolutionary War and James' turmoil at being caught between forces—American and British—beyond his own control, including anxiety over to whom he owes his allegiance. Also considered is the way of life of Native Americans, with whom James and his family intend to live at the close of the book.

== Structure, genre and style ==
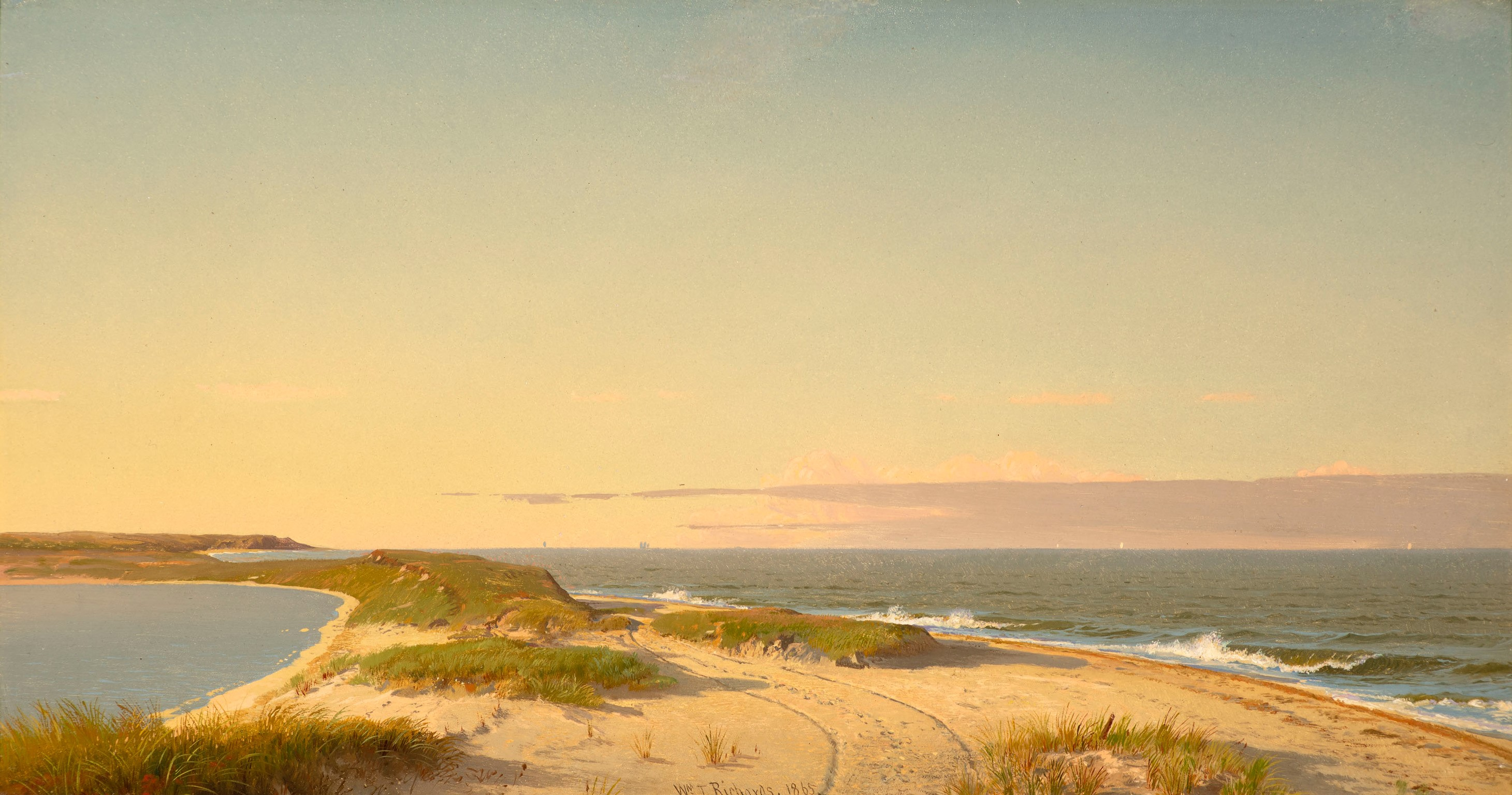
Nantucket from an 1865 painting. The island is one of several locations depicted in the Letters. An erroneous map, never corrected, was printed in several editions.

Letters is structured around the fictional correspondence via letters between James—an American farmer living in the Quaker colony of Pennsylvania—and an English gentleman, Mr F. B. However, it is only James' letters that are presented, as the addressee's answers are absent. The work consists of twelve letters that address a wide range of issues concerning life in the British colonies in America in the years prior to the American Revolutionary War. The "Introductory Letter" (Letter I) introduces the fictional narrator James, and each subsequent letter takes as its subject matter either a certain topic (Letter III "What is an American?") or a particular location that James visits (Letters IV, VI and IX describe Nantucket, Martha's Vineyard and Charles Town respectively), though certain themes span or are referred to within several letters. The exception to this is Letter XI, which is written by a Russian gentleman ("Mr. Iw——n Al——z") describing his visit to the botanist John Bartram, but who is presumed to also be writing to Mr F. B. Arranged as a series of discontinuous letters, the work can appear superficially disconnected, although critics have identified various levels of coherence and organization.

The text incorporates a broad range of genres, ranging from documentary on local agricultural practices to sociological observations of the places visited and their inhabitants; Norman Grabo describes it as "an example of the American tradition of book-as-anthology and authorship-as-editing". Whereas early readings of the text tended to consider it "as a straightforward natural and social history of young America", critics now see it as combining elements of fiction and non-fiction in what Thomas Philbrick has termed a "complex artistry". In addition to its usual classification as a form of epistolary, philosophical travel narrative—comparable to Montesquieu's Persian Letters—the text has been considered as a novel, and as a romance.

== Themes ==
=== Shift of tone ===
Letters has been said to exhibit a "model of decline", as the optimistic tone of the early letters is disrupted and the text become increasingly pessimistic; there is a movement from a "joy, pride, wonder" at the spectacle of America, to the "images of the inhuman brutality of slavery". However, there is disagreement over whether this model of decline is produced by James' own disillusionment, or whether it is evidence of Crèvecœur's voice interceding into the narrative; further, critics disagree over where in the narrative the disillusionment occurs, variably placing it in the third, eighth and ninth letters.

=== Relationship with the environment ===
Among the most significant and recurring themes of Letters is that of the individual and society's relationship with their environment; the work has been read as an "impassioned, unqualified defense of American agrarianism". The theme appears especially in Letter II, III and in the letters describing Nantucket and Martha's Vineyard, where James' views are expressive of the doctrine of environmental determinism, that human growth, development and activities are controlled by the physical environment. Anna Carew-Miller suggests that what the text articulates on this subject is "the [cultural] myth that a man's relationship with the land confirms his masculinity and dignity as a citizen."

== Reception and legacy ==
When Crèvecœur offered his manuscript essays to the London publishers Davies & Davis in 1782, they were initially skeptical about the potential for the Letters to be successful. However, the work proved to be instantly popular in England for a variety of reasons. Proponents of political reform such as William Godwin and Thomas Paine approved of the radical anti-government implications of its message. Romantic writers admired, and were influenced by, its evocation of the natural landscape and the individual's relationship to it. More widely, in the final years of the Revolutionary War, the public was eager for the documentary detail Letters provided about America. The popularity of the book led to a second edition being called for only a year later.

In continental Europe, Letters proved equally popular. Dutch and German translations were rapidly produced, and prompted by constant demand, editions appeared in such places as Dublin, Paris and Maastricht. In lieu of a second volume of letters, Crèvecœur produced an expanded French version (Lettres d'un cultivateur américain) that was published in 1784. The French version, which removed the fictional persona of James, is presented as a series of documents that have been neutrally edited, providing greater documentary detail but at the expense of artistry.

In the twentieth century there was a revival of interest in the text. Critic David Carlson suggests that it was "Not aesthetics, but the politics of nationalism appears to have been the primary force behind Crevecoeur's critical resurrection"—the Letters being among the first works to depict an American "melting pot". Letters, particularly Letter III ("What is an American?"), is frequently anthologized, and the work is recognized as being one of the first in the canon of American literature.

== See also ==
- Letters on the English (Lettres philosophiques) by Voltaire, and Persian Letters (Lettres persanes) by Montesquieu, two works in the same literary tradition.
- John Locke, an English philosopher whose ideas on Social Contract theory inform the views expressed in Letters.

== Bibliography ==
=== Modern editions ===
- Crèvecœur (1997). Manning, Susan (ed.). Letters from an American Farmer. New York: OUP. ISBN 978-0-19-955474-4.
- de Crèvecoeur, J. Hector St. John (1981). Albert E. Stone (ed.). Letters from an American Farmer and Sketches of Eighteenth-Century America. Penguin Classics. ISBN 978-0-14-039006-3.

=== Secondary sources ===
- Ben-Zvi, Yael (2007). "Mazes of Empire: Space and Humanity in Crèvecoeur's "Letters"". Early American Literature. 42 (1): 73–105. doi:10.1353/eal.2007.0002. JSTOR 25057482. S2CID 162250783. (subscription required)
- Beranger, Jean F. (1977). "The Desire of Communication: Narrator and Narratee in "Letters from an American Farmer"". Early American Literature. 12 (1): 73–85. JSTOR 25070813. (subscription required)
- Brogan, Hugh (2001). The Penguin History of the United States. England: Penguin. ISBN 978-0-14-025255-2.
- Carew-Miller, Anna (1993). "The Language of Domesticity in Crèvecoeur's Letters from an American Farmer". Early American Literature. 28 (3): 242–254. JSTOR 25056944. (subscription required)
- Carlson, David (2003). "Farmer versus lawyer". Early American Literature. 38 (2). Literature Online: 257. doi:10.1353/eal.2003.0024. S2CID 143644537.(subscription required)
- Grabo, Norman S. (1991). "Crèvecoeur's American: Beginning the World Anew". The William and Mary Quarterly. 48 (2): 159–172. doi:10.2307/2938066. JSTOR 2938066. (subscription required)
- Holbo, Christine (1997). "Imagination, Commerce, and the Politics of Associationism in Crèvecoeur's Letters from an American Farmer". Early American Literature. 32 (1): 20–65. JSTOR 25057072. (subscription required)
- Larkin, Edward (2006). "The cosmopolitan revolution: loyalism and the fiction of an American nation". Novel: A Forum on Fiction. 40 (1/2): 52–76. doi:10.1215/ddnov.040010052.(subscription required)
- Machor, James L. (1982). "The garden city in america: crevecoeur's letters and the urban-pastoral context". American Studies. 23 (1): 69–83. JSTOR 40641692. Archived from the original on March 5, 2016.
- Philbrick, Nathaniel (1991). "The Nantucket Sequence in Crèvecoeur's Letters from an American Farmer". The New England Quarterly. 64 (3): 414–432. doi:10.2307/366350. JSTOR 366350. (subscription required)
- Robinson, David (1981). "Crèvecoeur's James: The Education of an American Farmer". The Journal of English and Germanic Philology. 80 (4). University of Illinois Press: 552–571. JSTOR 27708923. (subscription required)
- Saar, Doreen Alvarez (1994). "J. Hector St. John de Crèvecoeur". In Paul Lautner (ed.). The Heath Anthology of American Literature: Volume One (Second ed.). Lexington, MA: D. C. Heath and Company. ISBN 0-669-32972-X.
- Saar, Doreen Alvarez (1987). "Crèvecoeur's "Thoughts on Slavery": "Letters from an American Farmer" and Whig Rhetoric". Early American Literature. 22 (2): 192–203. JSTOR 25056663. (subscription required)
- Winston, Robert P. (1985). "Strange Order of Things!: The Journey to Chaos in "Letters from an American Farmer"". Early American Literature. 19: 249–267. JSTOR 25057072. (subscription required)
