= List of Latin phrases (V) =

This page is one of a series listing English translations of notable Latin phrases, such as veni, vidi, vici and et cetera. Some of the phrases are themselves translations of Greek phrases, as ancient Greek rhetoric and literature started centuries before the beginning of Latin literature in ancient Rome.

Latin	Translation	Notes
vacate et scire	be still and know.	Motto of the University of Sussex
vade ad formicam	go to the ant	From the Vulgate, Proverbs 6:6. The full quotation translates as "Go to the ant, you sluggard; consider its ways and be wise!"
vade mecum	go with me	A vade-mecum or vademecum is an item one carries around, especially a handbook.
vade retro Satana	go back, Satan	An exhortation to Satan to be gone, often a Roman Catholic response to temptation. From a popular Medieval Roman Catholic exorcism formula, derived from the rebuke of Jesus Christ to St. Peter, as quoted in the Vulgate, Mark 8:33: vade retro me Satana ("get behind Me, Satan"). The phrase vade retro ("go back") is also in Terence's Formio, I, 4, 203.
vale	farewell	see also: ave atque vale
valenter volenter	strongly and willingly	Motto of HMS Valorous (L00)
vae, puto deus fio	ah, I think I am becoming a god	Last words of Vespasian according to Suetonius in his Twelve Caesars
vae victis	woe to the conquered	Attributed by Livy to Brennus, the chief of the Gauls, stated with his demand for more gold from the citizens of the sacked city of Rome in 390 BC.
vanitas vanitatum omnia vanitas	vanity of vanities; everything [is] vanity	Or more simply: "vanity, vanity, everything vanity". From the Vulgate, Ecclesiastes 1:2;12:8.
vaticinium ex eventu	prophecy from the event	A purported prediction stated as if it was made before the event it describes, while in fact being made thereafter.
vel non	or not	Summary of alternatives, e. g., "this action turns upon whether the claimant was the deceased's grandson vel non."
velle est posse	to be willing is to be able	Non-literally, "where there is a will, there is a way". It is the motto of Hillfield, one of the founding schools of Hillfield Strathallan College.
velocius quam asparagi coquantur	faster than asparagus can be cooked	Rendered by Robert Graves in I, Claudius as "as quick as boiled asparagus". Ascribed to Augustus by Suetonius in The Twelve Caesars, Book 2 (Augustus), para. 87. It refers to anything done very quickly. A very common variant is celerius quam asparagi cocuntur ("faster than asparagus [is] cooked").
vel similia	or similar (things), or the like	Abbreviated to vel sim. First attested in English usage in 1861.
velut arbor aevo	as a tree with the passage of time	Motto of the University of Toronto, Canada
veni, vidi, vici	I came, I saw, I conquered	The message supposedly sent by Julius Caesar to the Roman Senate to describe his battle against King Pharnaces II of Pontus near Zela in 47 BC.
venia aetatis	pardon my age	the privilege of age sometimes granted a minor under Roman or civil law, entitling the minor to the rights and liabilities of a person of full age, and resembling emancipation of minors in modern law
venia legendi or venia docendi	permission to read/teach	Part of habilitation process at universities
venturis ventis	to the coming winds	Motto of Brasília, the capital of Brazil
vera causa	true cause	
vera natura	true nature	Used in Metaphysics and specifically in Kant's Transcendental Idealism to refer to a subject as it exists in its logically distinct form rather than as it is perceived by the human faculty.
verba docent exempla trahunt	words instruct, illustrations lead	This refers to the relevance of illustrations, for example in preaching.
verba ex ore	words from mouth	Taking the words out of someone's mouth, speaking exactly what the other colloquist wanted to say.
verba ita sunt intelligenda ut res magis valeat quam pereat	words are to be understood such that the subject matter may be more effective than wasted	I. e., when explaining a subject, it is important to clarify rather than confuse.
verba vana aut risui non loqui	not to speak words in vain or to start laughter	A Roman Catholic religious precept, being Rule 56 of the Rule of Saint Benedict.
verba volant, scripta manent	words fly away, writings remain	
verbatim	word for word	The phrase refers to perfect transcription or quotation.
verbatim et literatim	word for word and letter by letter	
verbi divini minister	servant of the Divine Word	A phrase denoting a priest; cf. verbum Dei
verbi gratia (v. gr. or v. g.)	for example	Literally, "for the sake of a word".
verbum Dei	word of God	See also Logos (Christianity)
verbum dicendi	verb of speaking/utterance	word that expresses speech or introduces a quotation such as 'say', 'utter', 'ask'; a quotative
verbum Domini lucerna pedibus nostris	The word of the Lord [is] a light for our feet	Motto of the University of Groningen
verbum Domini manet in aeternum (VDMA)	the word of the Lord endures forever	Motto of the Lutheran Reformation
verb. sap. verbum sap.	a word to the wise [is sufficient]	A phrase denoting that the listener can fill in the omitted remainder, or enough is said. It is the truncation of verbum sapienti sat[is] est.
verbum volitans	flying word	A word that floats in the air, on which everyone is thinking and is just about to be imposed.
veritas	truth	Motto of many educational institutions
veritas aequitas	truth [and] justice	
veritas, bonitas, pulchritudo, sanctitas	truth, goodness, beauty, [and] sanctity	Motto of Fu Jen Catholic University, Taiwan
veritas Christo et ecclesiae	truth for Christ and church	The de iure motto of Harvard University, United States, which dates to its foundation; it is often shortened to veritas to remove its original religious meaning.
veritas cum libertate	truth with liberty	Motto of Winthrop University
veritas curat	truth cures	Motto of Jawaharlal Institute of Postgraduate Medical Education and Research
veritas Dei vincit	the truth of God conquers	Motto of the Hussites
veritas Domini manet in aeternum	the truth of the Lord remains for eternity	
veritas et fortitudo	truth and fortitude	One of the mottos of the Lyceum of the Philippines University
veritas et virtus	truth and virtue	Motto of the University of Pittsburgh, Methodist University, and Mississippi Christian University
veritas, fides, sapientia	truth, faith, [and] wisdom	Motto of Dowling Catholic High School
veritas in caritate	truth in charity	Motto of Bishop Wordsworth's School, St Munchin's College, and the University of Santo Tomas
veritas, iustitia, libertas	truth, justice, [and] liberty	Motto of the Free University of Berlin
veritas liberabit vos	truth shall liberate you	Motto of Xavier University – Ateneo de Cagayan
veritas lux mea	truth [is] my light	A common, non-literal translation is "truth enlightens me"; motto of Seoul National University, South Korea
veritas numquam perit	truth never expires	by Seneca the Younger
veritas odit moras	truth hates delay	by Seneca the Younger
veritas odium parit	truth breeds hatred	
veritas omnia vincit	truth conquers all	A quotation from a letter of Jan Hus; frequently used as a motto
veritas, probitas, iustitia	truth, honesty, justice	Motto of the University of Indonesia
veritas, unitas, caritas	truth, unity, [and] love	Motto of Villanova University, United States
veritas vincit	truth conquers	Cf. veritas omnia vincit. Motto on the standard of the presidents of Czechoslovakia and the Czech Republic, and of the Scottish Clan Keith
Veritas. Virtus. Libertas.	Truth. Virtue. Liberty.	Motto of the University of Szeged, Hungary
veritas vitæ magistra	truth is the teacher of life	Another plausible translation is "truth is the mistress of life". It is the unofficial motto of the University of Puerto Rico, Río Piedras and is inscribed in its tower.
veritas vos liberabit	truth will liberate you [all]	Motto of Johns Hopkins University, United States
veritate duce progredi	advancing with truth leading	Motto of the University of Arkansas, United States
[in] veritate et caritate	in truth and charity	Motto of Catholic Junior College, Singapore; St. Xavier's School, and Hazaribagh, India
veritate et virtute	with truth and virtue	Motto of Sydney Boys High School. It is alternatively rendered virtute et veritate ("with virtue and truth"), which is the motto of Walford Anglican School for Girls and Pocklington School.
veritatem dilexi	I esteemed truth	Alternatively, "I loved truth"; motto of Bryn Mawr College
veritatem fratribus testari	to bear witness to truth in fraternity	Motto of Xaverian Brothers High School
veritatem cognoscere	to know truth	Motto of the Clandestine Service of the United States Central Intelligence Agency
vero nihil verius	nothing [is] truer than truth	Motto of Mentone Girls' Grammar School
vero possumus	yes, we can	A variation of the campaign slogan of then-Senator Barack Obama, which was superimposed on a variation of the Great Seal of the United States during the US presidential campaign of 2008.
versus (vs) or (v.)	towards	Literally, "in the direction [of]". It is used in English meaning "against", e. g., the parties to litigation or a sports match; colloquially used to form the verb "verse, versed, versing" for "playing against".
vestigia nulla retrorsum	Never a backward step	Motto of Wanganui Collegiate School
vestis virum facit	Clothes make the man	Statement made by Erasmus to augment ancient commentary on the role of appearance in affirming authority
veto	I forbid	The word denotes the right to unilaterally forbid or void a specific proposal, especially legislation. It is derived from ancient Roman voting procedures.
vexata quaestio	vexed question	Latin legal phrase denoting a question that is often debated or considered, but is not generally settled, such that contrary answers may be held by different persons.
vexilla regis prodeunt inferni	forth go the banners of the king of Hell	Authored by Dante Alighieri in Canto XXXIV of the Inferno, the phrase is an allusion to and play upon the Latin Easter hymn Vexilla Regis. The phrase is repeatedly referenced in the works of Walter M. Miller, Jr.
vi coactus	under constraint	A legal phrase regarding contracts that indicates agreement made under duress.
vi et animo	with heart and soul	Alternatively, "strength and courage"; motto of the Ascham School
vi veri universum vivus vici	by the power of truth, I, while living, have conquered the universe	Magickal motto of Aleister Crowley.
via	by the road/way	The word denotes "by way of" or "by means of", e. g., "I will contact you via email".
via media	middle road/way	This phrase describes a compromise between two extremes or the radical center political position.
via, veritas, vita	the Way, the Truth, [and] the Life	Words of Jesus in John 14:6; motto of many institutions
viam sapientiae monstrabo tibi	I will show you the way of wisdom	Motto of DePaul University
vice	in place of	The word refers to one who acts in the place of another. It is used as a separate word or as a hyphenated prefix, e. g., "Vice President" and "Vice-Chancellor".
vice versa (Note: Occasionally, "versa vice" is used as an ironic, autological subversion of this phrase.)	with position turned	For other uses, see Vice Versa (disambiguation). Thus, "the other way around", "conversely", et cetera. Historically, in British English, vice is pronounced as two syllables, but in American and Canadian English the singular-syllable pronunciation is almost universal. Classical Latin pronunciation dictates that the letter "c" is only a hard sound, like "k". Moreover, the letter "v", when consonantal, represents /w/; hence WEE-keh WEHR-sah.
victoria amat curam	victory demands dedication	Motto of North Melbourne Football Club
victoria aut mors	Victory or death	Similar to aut vincere aut mori.
victoria concordia crescit	victory comes from harmony	Motto of Arsenal F.C.
victrix causa diis placuit sed victa Catoni	the victorious cause pleased the gods, but the conquered cause pleased Cato	Authored by Lucan in Pharsalia, 1, 128. The dedicatory inscription on the south face of the Confederate Memorial in Arlington National Cemetery, Virginia, United States.
vide	"see" or "refer to"	The word is used in scholarly citations.
vide infra (v. i.)	see below	The word is used in scholarly works.
vide supra (v. s.)	see above	The word is used in scholarly works to refer to previous text in the same document. It is sometimes truncated to supra.
videlicet (viz.)	"namely", "that is to say", or "as follows"	A contraction of videre licet ("it is permitted to see"), vide infra.
video et taceo	I see and keep silent	Motto of Queen Elizabeth I of England
video meliora proboque deteriora sequor	I see and approve of the better, but I follow the worse	From the Metamorphoses Book 7, 20-1 of Ovid, being a summary of the experience of akrasia.
video sed non credo	I see it, but I do not believe it	The statement of Caspar Hofmann after being shown proof of the circulatory system by William Harvey.
videre licet	"it is permitted to see" or "one may see"	used in scholarship
(doctrina) vim promovet insitam	(education) promotes the innate force	derived from Horace, Ode 4, 4; motto of the University of Bristol
vince malum bono	overcome evil with good	A partial quotation of Romans 12:21; motto of Old Swinford Hospital and Bishop Cotton School in Shimla
vincere est vivere	to conquer is to live	Motto of Captain John Smith
vincere scis Hannibal victoria uti nescis	you know [how] to win, Hannibal; you do not know [how] to use victory	According to Livy, a colonel in the cavalry stated this to Hannibal after victory in the Battle of Cannae in 216 BC, meaning that Hannibal should have marched on Rome immediately.
vincit omnia veritas	truth conquers all	motto of University of Mindanao, Philippines
vincit qui patitur	he conquers who endures	First attributed to the Roman scholar and satirist Persius; frequently used as a motto.
vincit qui se vincit	he (she) conquers who conquers himself (herself)	Motto of many educational institutions, including the Philadelphia High School for Girls and North Sydney Boys High School. It is alternatively rendered as bis vincit qui se vincit ("he (she) who prevails over himself (herself) is twice victorious"). It is also the motto of the Beast in Disney's film Beauty and the Beast, as seen inscribed in the castle's stained glass window near the beginning of the film.
vinculum juris	the chain of the law	The phrase denotes that a thing is legally binding. "A civil obligation is one which has a binding operation in law, vinculum juris." (Bouvier's Law Dictionary (1856), "Obligation")
vinum et musica laetificant cor	wine and music gladden the heart	Asterix and Caesar's Gift; it is a variation of vinum bonum laetificat cor hominis.
vinum regum, rex vinorum	the wine of kings, the king of wines	The phrase describes Hungarian Tokaji wine, and is attributed to King Louis XIV of France.
viperam sub ala nutricare	a viper nursed at the bosom	A caveat regarding trusting someone against his inherent nature; the moral of Aesop's fable The Farmer and the Viper.
vir quisque vir	every man a man	Motto of the US collegiate fraternity Lambda Chi Alpha.
vires acquirit eundo	she gathers strength as she goes	A quotation from Vergil's Aeneid, Book 4, 175, which in the original context refers to Pheme. Motto on the Coat of arms of Melbourne
virgo intacta	intact/untouched virgin	a female whose hymen is unbroken, who has never had sexual intercourse
viribus unitis	with united forces	Motto of the house of Habsburg-Lorraine
virile agitur	the manly thing is being done	Motto of Knox Grammar School
viriliter age	"act manfully" or "act courageously"	Motto of Marist College Ashgrove and other institutions
viriliter agite	act in a manly way	Motto of St Muredach's College and PAREF Southridge School for Boys. From Psalm 27
viriliter agite estote fortes	act manfully, be strong	Motto of Culford School
virtus et labor	virtue and [hard] work	
virtus et scientia	virtue and knowledge	Common motto
virtus in media stat	virtue stands in the middle	A principle derived from the ethical theory of Aristotle. Idiomatically, "good practice lies in the middle path" between two extremes. It is disputed whether media or medio is correct.
virtus junxit mors non separabit	that which virtue unites, let not death separate	
virtus laudata crescit	greatness increases with praise	Motto of the Berkhamsted School
virtus non stemma	valor, not garland	Motto of the Duke of Westminster, inscribed at his residence in Eaton, and the motto of Grosvenor Rowing Club and Harrow County School for Boys
virtus sola nobilitas	virtue alone [is] noble	Motto of Christian Brothers College, St Kilda; similar to sola nobilitat virtus
virtus tentamine gaudet	strength rejoices in the challenge	Motto of Hillsdale College, Michigan, United States
virtus unita fortior	virtue united [is] stronger	State motto of Andorra
virtute duce	led by virtue	
virtute duce comite fortuna	led by virtue, accompanied by [good] fortune	
virtute et armis	by virtue and arms	Alternatively, "by manliness and weapons". The State motto of Mississippi, United States. The phrase was possibly derived from the motto of Lord Gray de Wilton, virtute non armis fido ("I trust in virtue, not in arms").
virtute et constantia	by virtue and consistency	National motto of Malta. Also motto of the Estonian Internal Security Service.
virtute et eruditione	by virtue and by learning	Motto of Titchfield High School in Port Antonio, Jamaica.
virtute et industria	by virtue and industry	Motto of Bristol, United Kingdom
virtute et valor	by virtue and valour	Motto of St George’s Grammar School, Cape Town, and of a High School
virtute et veritate	by virtue and truth	Motto of Pocklington School
vis legis	the power of the law	
vis major	force majeure, superior force	
visio dei	vision of a god	
vita ante acta	a life done before	The phrase denotes a previous life, generally believed to be the result of reincarnation.
vita, dulcedo, spes	Mary, [our] life, sweetness, [and] hope	Motto of the University of Notre Dame, Indiana, United States, which is derived from the Roman Catholic hymn to the Blessed Virgin Mary titled Salve Regina.
vita incerta, mors certissima	life is uncertain, death is most certain	More simply, "the most certain thing in life is death".
vita mutatur, non tollitur	life is changed, not taken away	The phrase is a quotation from the preface of the first Roman Catholic rite of the Mass for the Dead.
vita patris	during the life of the father	Hence the term decessit vita patris (d. v. p) or "died v. p.", which is seen in genealogical works such as Burke's Peerage.
vitae summa brevis spem nos vetat incohare longam	the shortness of life prevents us from entertaining far-off hopes	This is a wistful refrain that is sometimes used ironically. It is derived from the first line of Horace's Ode 1. It was later used as the title of a short poem of Ernest Dowson.
vitae corona fides	faith is the crown of life	Motto of Colchester Royal Grammar School.
vitai lampada tradunt	they hand on the torch of life	A quotation from the poem of Lucretius, De rerum natura, Book 2, 77–79. The ordinary spelling vi-tae in two syllables had to be changed to vi-ta-ï in three syllables to satisfy the requirements of the poem's dactylic hexameters. Motto of the Sydney Church of England Grammar School and others.
vitam amplificare hominibus hominesque societati	mankind [who] extends the life of the community	Motto of East Los Angeles College, California, United States
viva voce	living voice	"by word of mouth"; oral exam; spoken, in-person, evidence in law
vivat crescat floreat	may it live, grow, [and] flourish	
vivat rex	may the king live	The acclamation is ordinary translated as "long live the king!". In the case of a queen, vivat regina ("long live the queen").
vivat rex, curat lex	long live the king, guardian of the law	found in Westerham parish church in Kent, England
vive memor leti	live remembering death	Authored by Persius. Cf. memento mori.
vive ut vivas	live so that you may live	The phrase suggests that one should live life to the fullest and without fear of the possible consequences.
vivere est cogitare	to live is to think	Authored by Cicero. Cf. cogito, ergo sum.
vivere militare est	to live is to fight	Authored by Seneca the Younger in Epistle 96, 5. Cf. the allegory of Miles Christianus based on militia est vita hominis from the Vulgate, Book of Job 7:1.
vivida vis animi	lively power of the mind	Lucretius, De rerum natura I
vocare ad regnum	call to fight	Alternatively, "call to Kingdom". Motto of professional wrestler Triple H, and seen in his entrance video.
vocatus atque non vocatus Deus aderit	called and not called, God will be present	Alternatively, "called and even not called, God approaches". Attributed to the Oracle at Delphi. Motto of Carl Jung, and inscribed in his home and grave.
volenti non fit injuria	to one willing, no harm is done	Alternatively, "to him who consents, no harm is done". The principle is used in the law of torts and denotes that one can not be held liable for injuries inflicted on another who consented to the act that injured him.
volo non fugia	I fly but do not flee	Motto of HMS Venetia
vos estis sal terrae	you are the salt of the earth	Biblical sentence proclaimed by Jesus
votum separatum	separate vow	The phrase denotes an independent, minority voice.
vox clamantis in deserto	the voice of one clamoring in the desert	Or traditionally, "the voice of one crying in the wilderness". A quotation of the Vulgate, Isaiah 40:3, and quoted by St. John the Baptist in Mark 1:3 and John 1:23). Motto of Dartmouth College, Hanover, New Hampshire, United States.
vox nihili	voice of nothing	The phrase denotes a useless or ambiguous statement.
vox populi	voice of the people	The phrase denotes a brief interview of a common person that is not previously arranged, e. g., an interview on a street. It is sometimes truncated to "vox pop."
vox populi, vox Dei	the voice of the people [is] the voice of God	
vulpes pilum mutat, non mores	the fox changes his fur, not his habits	By extension, and in common morality, humanity can change their attitudes, but they will hardly change their objectives or what they have set themselves to achieve. Ascribed to Titus by Suetonius in the eighth book (chapter 16) of The Twelve Caesars.
