= Btaaboura =

Village in Koura District, Lebanon

Coordinates: 34°16′N 35°46′E

Btaaboura بتعبورا
- Village
- Location within Lebanon
- Country: Lebanon
- Governorate: North
- District: Koura

Btaaboura (Arabic: بتعبورا) is a village in Koura District of Lebanon. The population is Greek Orthodox. A church is being constructed as of June 2011, it is dedicated to St. Elias. In 1953, Btaaboura had a population of 350 living in 36 households.

In 1997 and on 21 November 2011, Michel Temer, then Vice President of Brazil, visited Btaaboura, which is the birthplace of his father, Nakhoul (Miguel) Temer, and mother, Marcha Barbar.

== Demographics ==
In 2014, Christians made up 98.31% of registered voters in Btaaboura. 90.15% of the voters were Greek Orthodox.
