= Grosvenor Rowing Club =

British rowing club

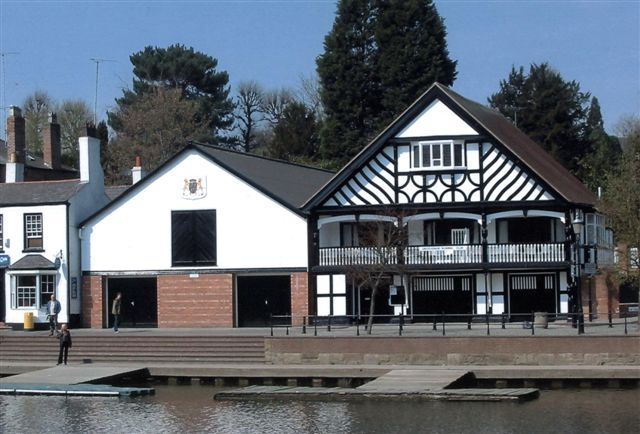

- Motto: Virtus non stemma
- Location: Groves, Chester, England
- Home water: River Dee
- Founded: 1869
- Key people: David Peake (Captain)
- Affiliations: British Rowing boat code - GRO
- Website: grosvenor-rowingclub.org.uk

Events
- Dee Autumn Head

Grosvenor Rowing Club is based on the Groves in Chester. It rows on the River Dee and has around 30 km of rowable river, much of which straight and broad.

The club colours are dark blue and orange.

== History ==
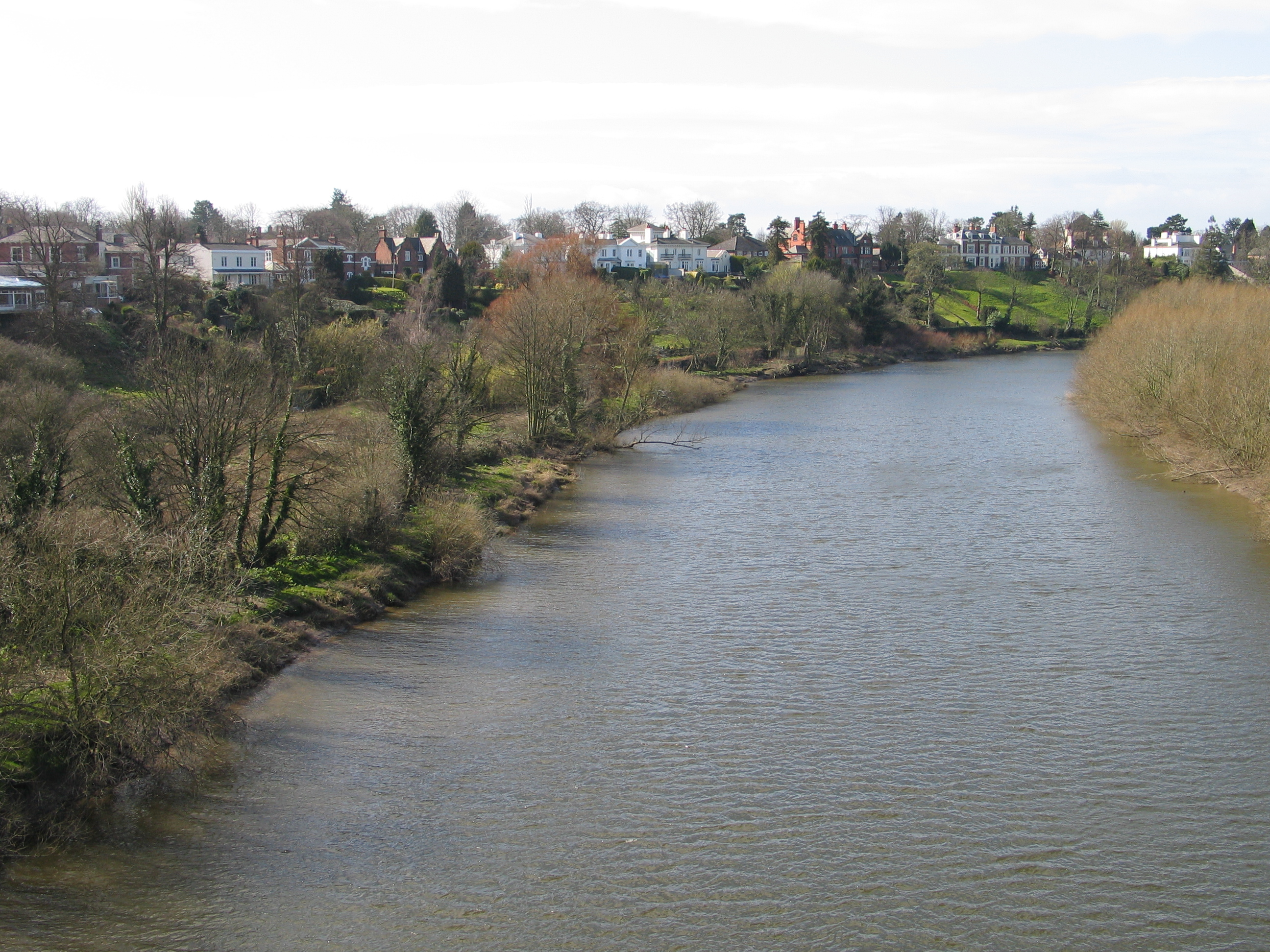
View of the Dee from the famous Grosvenor Bridge in Chester, looking down-river towards Curzon Park. Taken in Spring at high tide

Grosvenor (/ˈɡroʊvənər/ GROH-vən-ər) is named in honour of the Grosvenor family, who own the land on which the club was built. The club names its eights (8+) after members of the family. Founded in 1869, the club was established to enable the less fortunate residents of Chester to take up the sport of rowing. The club's crest states "Virtus non stemma" which translates to "Valor, not garland" or "Virtue, not pedigree" derived from the motto of the Duke of Westminster's Eaton Hall home (hist. Earl Grosvenor) which is their surname, which is further up the Dee. The motto also sums up the open membership of the club since its inauguration; originally contrasting to the closed membership of Royal Chester Rowing Club which was traditionally limited to alumni of the independent King's School, Chester. Today, the rivalry between the two clubs is sporting rather than social, as both clubs have completely open membership policies.

In 2019, the club celebrated its 150th anniversary and was honoured to be granted a row-past by Sir Steve Redgrave on the Saturday lunchtime of Henley Royal Regatta.

=== Recent results ===
In 2019, during the club's 150th year, Lucy Iball, competing in the Aspirational Single Sculls (A1x), won the Bernard Churcher Trophy at Henley Women's Regatta. She also became the club's first-ever women's sculler to qualify for Henley Royal Regatta, competing in the Princess Royal Challenge Cup

In 2014, the Grosvenor senior women's intermediate club fours won The Lester Trophy at Henley Women's Regatta.

Grosvenor's men's 1st VIII/8+ finished 14th at the 2008 Head of the River Race after starting 153rd, beaten narrowly to the Jackson Trophy (One of three regional cups, specifically for British non-tideway, non-Thames basin clubs) by 5 seconds by Agecroft Rowing Club, Manchester who finished 11th. The latter boat was seeded in 37th place which can provide flatter water.

Also in 2008, the men's 1st 8+ reached the quarter-finals of the Thames Challenge Cup at Henley Royal Regatta matching the club's successes at the 2007 regatta.

In 2007, Grosvenor's Coxless Four (4-) reached the semi-finals at Henley Royal Regatta in the Wyfold Challenge Cup. They beat London 'D', Reading and Sydney before knocked out by eventual winners, 1829 Boat Club which is the name used for composites of CUBC and OUBC alumni clubs/divisions Crabtree BC and Bosporos RC.

== Honours ==
=== British champions ===
Year	Winning crew/s
1988	Men L2x
1994	Women 4x, Women J18 1x, Women J15 1x
2003	Women L4-

== See also ==
British Rowing, the governing body.
