= Vi veri universum vivus vici =

Latin saying

Vi veri universum vivus vici (or Vi veri vniversvm vivvs vici) is a modern Latin phrase meaning "By the power of truth, I, while living, have conquered the universe". Due to the popularity of Alan Moore's graphic novel V for Vendetta, the phrase has been incorrectly but commonly attributed to Christopher Marlowe's Doctor Faustus. The source of this attribution, as well as the origin of the phrase itself, appears to be Aleister Crowley's "The Herb Dangerous (Part II) : The Psychology of Hashish", published as "Oliver Haddo". Since in the Latin alphabet there is no distinction between U and V, the phrase can be abbreviated V.V.V.V.V., standing for Vi veri vniversvm vivvs vici. In the 1998 revised edition of Crowley's diary, the list of abbreviations describes "V.V.V.V.V" as Crowley's "8°=3° A∴A∴ motto".

The phrase is apparently first mentioned as Faust's motto in Robert Nye's novel Faust (1980). This attribution is taken up in V for Vendetta (1982–1988). Here, the initialism "V.V.V.V.V." appears embossed in an arch of V's hideout the "Shadow Gallery" — the character of "V" explains that these stand for the phrase Vi veri veniversum [sic] vivus vici, attributing the phrase to "a German gentleman named Dr. John Faust". In the film adaptation (2005), the same phrase appears instead on a mirror, also inside "V"'s Shadow Gallery, and the character "V" says the quotation is "from Faust". The phrase used in the book and film is incorrect, as veniversum is not a word in Latin. The phrase also appears in Moore's Promethea, issue No. 20, "The Stars Are But Thistles" when Sophie Bangs and Barbara Shelley encounter a woman, Alice, who might be Aleister Crowley, riding a camel on Route 13, gimel of the kabbalistic Tree of Life – the path from Tiphareth to Kether. Alice points to the markings behind her – V.V.V.V.V. – and notes them to be like five footprints of a camel.
