= Viva voce =

Viva voce is a Latin phrase literally meaning "with living voice" but most often translated as "by word of mouth."

It may refer to:

- Word of mouth
- A voice vote in a deliberative assembly
- An oral exam
  - Thesis defence, in academia
- Spoken evidence in law
- Viva Voce (band), an American indie rock band
