= Virtus non stemma =

Motto of the Duke of Westminster

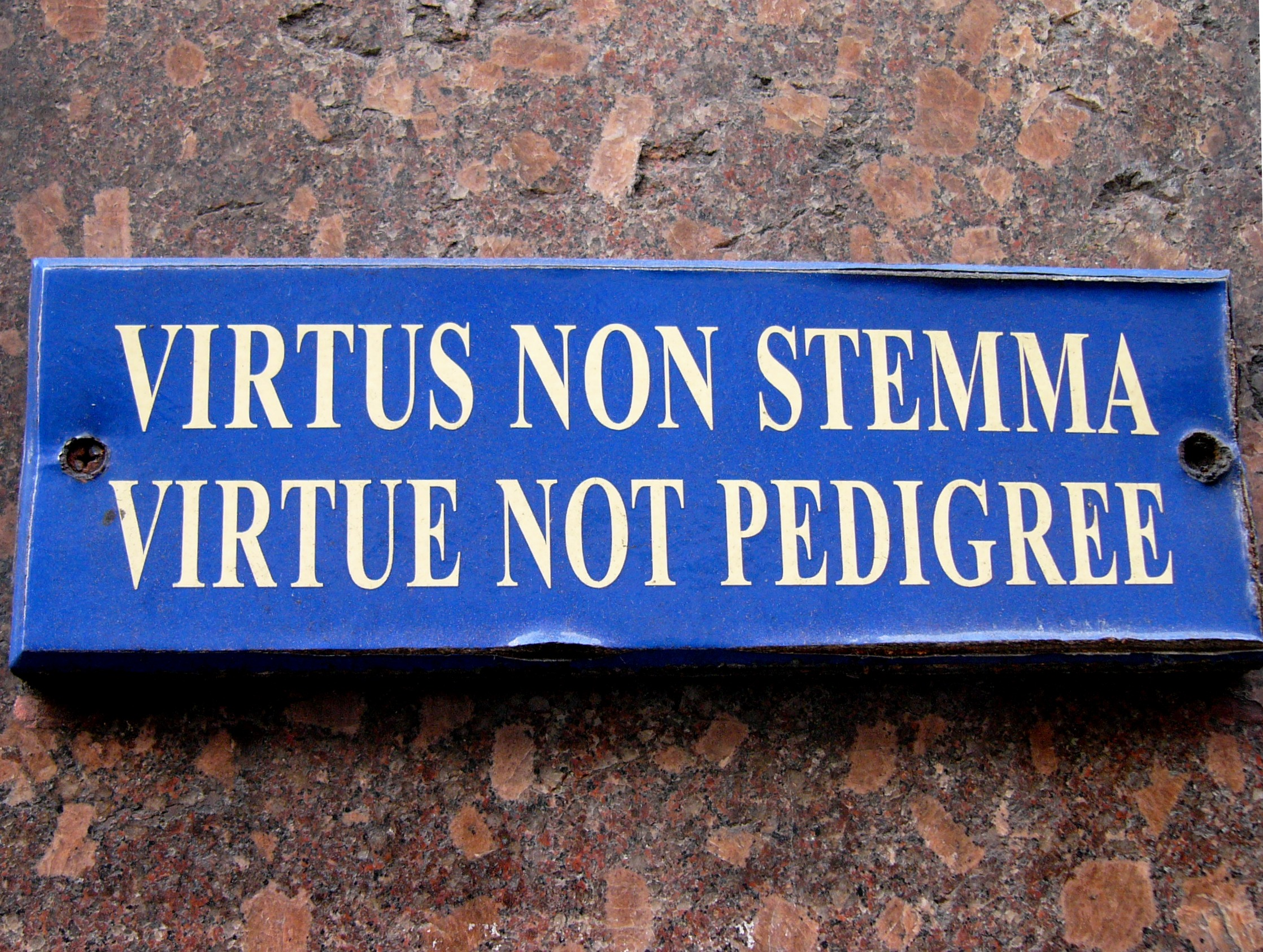
The motto, at the Duke of Westminsters's mansion

Virtus non stemma is Latin for "Valour, not garland". This is the Duke of Westminster's motto at his stately home in Eaton. The motto means, less literally: Courage, not pomp. The Duke also has many stately homes with the same motto. It is the motto of Grosvenor Rowing Club and also used to be the motto of Harrow County School for Boys where it was usually translated as 'Worth, not Birth'.

The Latin words can also be translated as "Virtue, not pedigree". An expansion of the phrase used in some heraldry documents, Nobilitatis virtus non stemma character, means: "Virtue, not pedigree, is the mark of nobility".

It was also the motto of the Grosvenor Hotel, originally the home of Lady Grosvenor, located at 35 Fifth Avenue in New York, (first building, 1876; second building 1926; a hotel until 1964, when it was purchased by New York University).
