= Verba volant, scripta manent =

Latin proverb

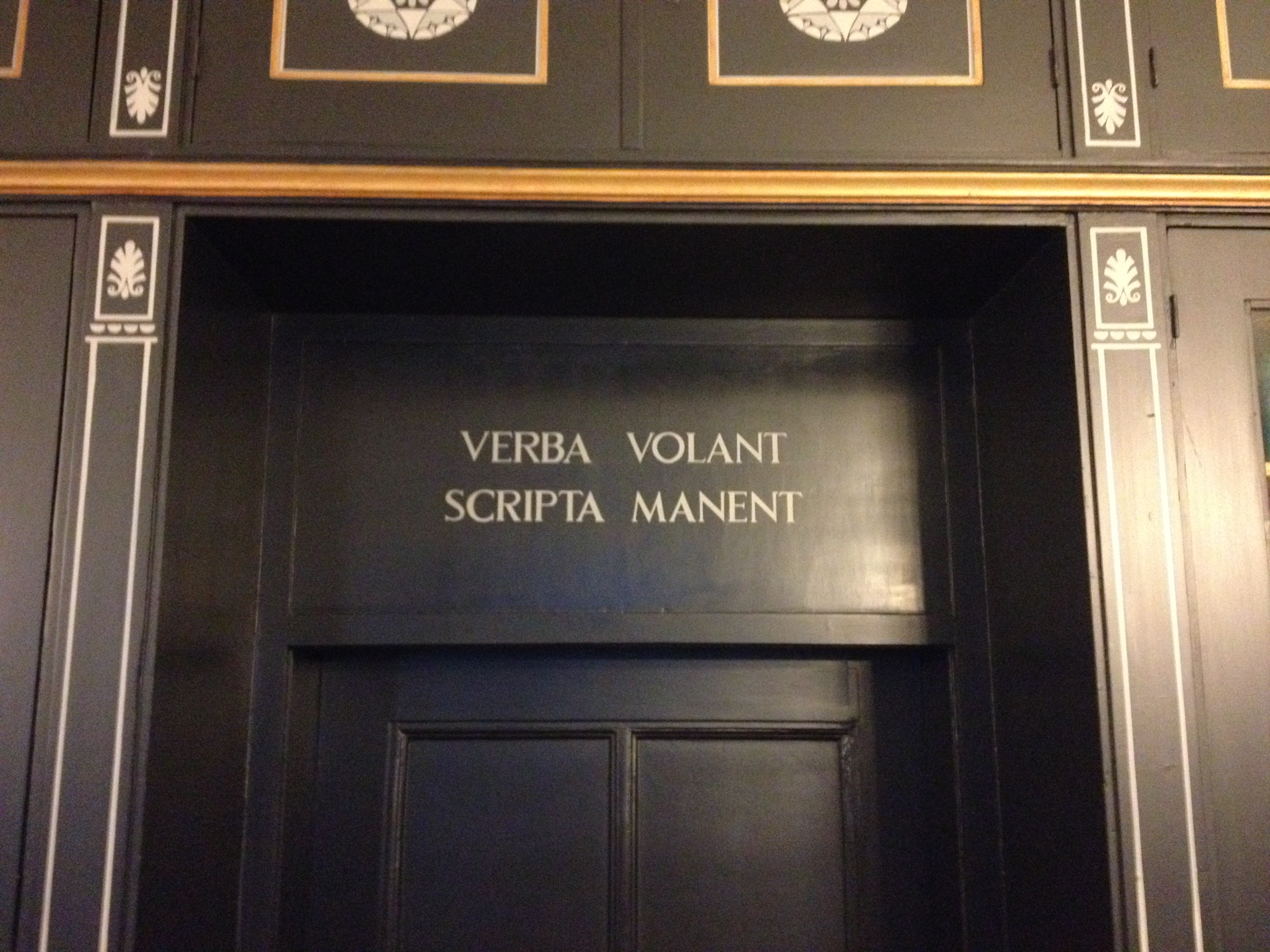
The Latin proverb on a hospital library door in Germany

"Verba volant, scripta manent" is a Latin proverb, which translates as "(spoken) words fly away, written ones remain". Other versions include verba volant, (sed) littera scripta manet, "(spoken) words fly away, but the written letter remains". (Note: Note the plural manent in the first version, singular manet in the second; scripta can be a plural noun ("writings", "written words"), or a singular adjective modifying "littera" ("letter", "the [written] word").)

== Origin and meaning ==
The authorship of this proverb is, as with many others, unknown, but it was well known by the seventeenth century, when it was used in Francis Turretin's De Libro Vitae. (Note: Nam ut voces et verba volant, sed litera scripta manet, ita decretum Dei non est inane verbum, quod irritum fiat et solvi possit, sed verbum potens et efficax, quod, in mente Dei scriptum, mansurum est in aetemum, et certissime implendum.)

The general meaning is that spoken words are ephemeral, and easily forgotten or disputed, but writing can be relied on to prove what was said or agreed to. Applied in a legal context, it means that if people wish to establish a formal agreement, it is best to put it in writing, in order to avoid the disputes that may arise from an oral agreement.

== See also ==
- List of Latin phrases
- Common knowledge
