= List of Latin phrases (C) =

This page is one of a series listing English translations of notable Latin phrases, such as veni, vidi, vici and et cetera. Some of the phrases are themselves translations of Greek phrases, as ancient Greek rhetoric and literature started centuries before the beginning of Latin literature in ancient Rome.

Latin	Translation	Notes
cacatum non est pictum	That's shat, not painted.	From Gottfried August Bürger's Prinzessin Europa (line 60); popularised by Heinrich Heine's Deutschland. Ein Wintermärchen (XI, 44); also the title of Joseph Haydn's canon for four voices, Hob. XXVIIb:16; Ludwig van Beethoven set the text by Bürger as a three-voice canon, WoO 224. Contemporary critics applied this epithet to both of Turner's Regulus (1828 and 1837).
cacoethes scribendi	insatiable desire to write	Cacoēthes "bad habit", or medically, "malignant disease" is a borrowing of Greek kakoēthes. The phrase is derived from a line in the Satires of Juvenal: Tenet insanabile multos scribendi cacoethes, or "the incurable desire (or itch) for writing affects many". See hypergraphia.
cadavera vero innumera	truly countless bodies	Used by the Romans to describe the aftermath of the Battle of the Catalaunian Plains.
Caedite eos. Novit enim Dominus qui sunt eius.	Kill them all. For the Lord knows those who are his.	Supposed statement by Abbot Arnaud Amalric before the Massacre at Béziers during the Albigensian Crusade, recorded 30 years later, according to Caesarius of Heisterbach. cf. "Kill them all and let God sort them out."
Caelum non animum mutant qui trans mare currunt	Those who hurry across the sea change the sky [upon them], not their souls or state of mind	Hexameter in epistle 11 of Horace's Epistles. Seneca shortens it to Animum debes mutare, non caelum (You must change [your] disposition, not [your] sky) in his Letter to Lucilius XXVIII, 1.
Caesar non supra grammaticos	Caesar has no authority over the grammarians	Political power is limited; it does not include power over grammar.
caetera desunt	the rest is missing	Caetera is Medieval Latin spelling for cētera.
calix meus inebrians	my cup making me drunk	
calamus gladio fortior	The pen is mightier than the sword	
camera obscura	dark chamber	An optical device used in drawing, and an ancestor of modern photography. The source of the word camera.
Cane Nero magna bella Persica	Tell, oh Nero, of the great wars of Persia	Perfectly correct Latin sentence usually reported as funny from modern Italians because the same exact words, in today's dialect of Rome, mean "A black dog eats a beautiful peach", which has a ridiculously different meaning.
canes pugnaces	war dogs or fighting dogs	
canescunt vani, vanescunt cani	The vain turn grey, the grey vanish	A play on words.
canis canem edit	dog eats dog	Not from classical Latin; a situation where nobody is safe from anybody, each man for himself. Original name of the video game Bully.
capax Dei	capable of receiving God	From Augustine, De Trinitate XIV, 8.11: Mens eo ipso imago Dei est quo eius capax est, "The mind is the image of God, in that it is capable of Him and can be partaker of Him."
capax imperii nisi imperasset	capable of imperial power if only he had not held it	In Tacitus's Histories to describe Galba as emperor
capax infiniti	holding the infinite	Capability of achieving goals by force of many instead of a single individual
caput inter nubila (condit)	(she plunges) [her] head in the clouds	So aggrandized as to be beyond practical (earthly) reach or understanding (from Virgil's Aeneid and the shorter form appears in John Locke's Two Treatises of Government)
caput mortuum	dead head	Originally an alchemical reference to the dead head or worthless residue left over from a reaction. Also used to refer to a freeloader or worthless element.
Caritas Christi	The love of Christ	It implies a command to love as Christ loved. Motto of St. Francis Xavier High School located in West Meadowlark Park, Edmonton.
Caritas Christi urget nos	The love of Christ impels us or The love of Christ drives us	Motto of the Sisters of Charity
Caritas in veritate	Charity in truth	Pope Benedict XVI's third encyclical
carpe diem	seize the day	An exhortation to live for today. From Horace, Odes I, 11.8. Carpere refers to plucking of flowers or fruit. The phrase collige virgo rosas has a similar sense.
carpe noctem	seize the night	An exhortation to make good use of the night, often used when carpe diem would seem absurd, e.g., when observing a deep-sky object or conducting a Messier marathon or engaging in social activities after sunset.
carpe vinum	seize the wine	
Carthago delenda est	Carthage must be destroyed	The Roman senator Cato the Elder ended every speech after the Second Punic War with ceterum censeo Carthaginem esse delendam, literally "For the rest, I am of the opinion that Carthage is to be destroyed."
castigat ridendo mores	One corrects customs by laughing at them	Or, "[Comedy/Satire] criticises customs through humour", is a phrase coined by French Neo-Latin poet Jean-Baptiste de Santeul (1630–1697), but sometimes wrongly attributed to his contemporary Molière or to Roman lyric poet Horace.
Casum sentit dominus	accident is felt by the owner	Refers to the private law principle that the owner has to assume the risk of accidental harm to him or accidental loss to his property.
casus belli	event of war	Refers to an incident that is the justification or case for war.
causa latet, vis est notissima	The cause is hidden, but the result is well known.	Ovid: Metamorphoses IV, 287; motto of Alpha Sigma Phi.
causa mortis	cause of death	
cave	beware!	especially used by Doctors of Medicine, when they want to warn each other (e.g.: "cave nephrolithiases" in order to warn about side effects of an uricosuric). Spoken aloud in some British public (paid) schools by pupils to warn each other of impending authority.
cave canem	Beware of the dog	Earliest written example is in the Satyricon of Petronius, circa 1st century C.E.
caveat emptor	let the buyer beware	The purchaser is responsible for checking whether the goods suit his need. Phrases modeled on this one replace emptor with lector, subscriptor, venditor, utilitor: "reader", "signer", "seller", "user".
caveat venditor	let the seller beware	It is a counter to caveat emptor and suggests that sellers can also be deceived in a market transaction. This forces the seller to take responsibility for the product and discourages sellers from selling products of unreasonable quality.
cedant arma togae	let arms yield to the gown	"Let military power yield to civilian power", Cicero, De Officiis I:77. Former motto of the Territory of Wyoming. See also Toga#Roman military.
cedere nescio	I know not how to yield	Motto of HMAS Norman
Celer – Silens – Mortalis	Swift – Silent – Deadly	The motto of the force reconnaissance companies of the United States Marine Corps, also known as force recon.
celerius quam asparagi cocuntur	more swiftly than asparagus [stem]s are cooked	Or simply "faster than cooking asparagus". A variant of the Roman phrase velocius quam asparagi coquantur, using a different adverb and an alternative mood and spelling of coquere.
cepi corpus	I have taken the body	In law, it is a return made by the sheriff, upon a capias, or other process to the like purpose; signifying, that he has taken the body of the party. See also habeas corpus.
certiorari	to be made certain	From certiorari volumus, "we wish to be made certain." A prerogative writ, by which a superior court orders an inferior one to turn over its record for review. Now used, depending on the jurisdiction, for an order granting leave to appeal a decision (e.g. to the Supreme Court of the United States) or judicial review of a lower court's order.
certum est quod certum reddi potest	it is certain, whatever can be rendered certain	Or "... if it can be rendered certain." Often used in law when something is not known, but can be ascertained (e.g. the purchase price on a sale which is to be determined by a third-party valuer)
cessante ratione legis cessat ipsa lex	when the reason for the law ceases, the law itself ceases	A rule of law becomes ineffective when the reason for its application has ceased to exist or does not correspond to the reality anymore. By Gratian.
cetera desunt	the rest are missing	Also spelled "caetera desunt".
ceteris paribus	all other things being equal	That is, disregarding or eliminating extraneous factors in a situation.
charta pardonationis se defendendo	a paper of pardon to defend oneself	The form of a pardon for killing another man in self-defence (see manslaughter).
charta pardonationis utlagariae	a paper of pardon to the outlaw	The form of a pardon of a man who is outlawed. Also called perdonatio utlagariae.
Christianos ad leones	[Throw the] Christians to the lions!	
Christo et Doctrinae	For Christ and Learning	The motto of Furman University.
Christus nos liberavit	Christ has freed us	title of volume I, book 5, chapter XI of Les Misérables by Victor Hugo.
Christus Rex	Christ the King	A Christian title for Jesus.
Cicero dicit fac hoc	Cicero says do it	Said by some to be the origin of the game command and title Simon says.
Cicero pro domo sua	Cicero's speech in 57 BC to regain his confiscated house	Said of someone who pleads cases for their own benefit; see List of Latin phrases (P) § pro domo
circa (c.) or (ca.)	around	In the sense of "approximately" or "about". Usually used of a date.
circulus in probando	circle made in testing [a premise]	Circular reasoning. Similar term to circulus vitiosus.
circulus vitiosus	vicious circle	In logic, begging the question, a fallacy involving the presupposition of a proposition in one of the premises (see petitio principii). In science, a positive feedback loop. In economics, a counterpart to the virtuous circle.
citius altius fortius	faster, higher, stronger	Motto of the modern Olympics.
civis romanus sum	I am (a) Roman citizen	Is a phrase used in Cicero's In Verrem as a plea for the legal rights of a Roman citizen
clamea admittenda in itinere per atturnatum	a claim to be admitted to the eyre by an attorney	A writ whereby the king of England could command the justice of an eyre (a medieval form of circuit court) to permit an attorney to represent a person who is employed in the king's service and therefore cannot come in person.
clarere audere gaudere	[be] bright, daring, joyful	Motto of the Geal family
clausum fregit	he broke the enclosure	A legal action for trespass to land; so called because the writ demands the person summoned to answer wherefore he broke the close (quare clausum fregit), i.e., why he entered the plaintiff's land.
claves Sancti Petri	the keys of Saint Peter	A symbol of the Papacy.
clavis aurea	golden key	The means of discovering hidden or mysterious meanings in texts, particularly applied in theology and alchemy.
clerico admittendo	for being made a clerk	In law, a writ directed to the bishop, for the admitting a clerk to a benefice upon a ne admittas, tried, and found for the party who procures the writ.
clerico capto per statutum mercatorum		In law, a writ for the delivery of a clerk out of prison, who is imprisoned upon the breach of statute merchant.
clerico convicto commisso gaolae in defectu ordinarii deliberando		In law, a writ for the delivery of a clerk to his ordinary, that was formerly convicted of felony; by reason that his ordinary did not challenge him according to the privilege of clerks.
clerico intra sacros ordines constituto non eligendo in officium		In law, a writ directed to the bailiffs, etc., that have thrust a bailiwick or beadleship upon one in holy orders; charging them to release him.
Codex Iuris Canonici	Book of Canon Law	The official code of canon law in the Roman Catholic Church (cf. Corpus Iuris Canonici).
Cogitationis poenam nemo patitur	No one suffers punishment for mere intent.	No one can be punished for their thoughts.
cogito, ergo sum	I think, therefore I am.	A rationalistic argument used by French philosopher René Descartes to attempt to prove his own existence.
coitus interruptus	interrupted congress	Aborting sexual intercourse prior to ejaculation—the only permitted form of birth control in some religions.
coitus more ferarum	congress in the way of beasts	A medical euphemism for the doggy-style sexual position.
collige virgo rosas	pick, girl, the roses	Exhortation to enjoy fully the youth, similar to Carpe diem, from "De rosis nascentibus" (also titled "Idyllium de rosis"), attributed to Ausonius or Virgil. / "Gather ye rosebuds while ye may", 1909, by John William Waterhouse
combinatio nova	new combination	It is frequently abbreviated comb. nov.. It is used in the life sciences literature when a new name is introduced, e.g. Klebsiella granulomatis comb. nov..
comedamus et bibamus, cras enim moriemur	let us eat and drink, for tomorrow we die	Latin translation of no. 72 of John Chrysostom's 88 Greek homilies on the Gospel of John, citing Isaiah 22:13
communibus annis	in common years	One year with another; on an average. "Common" here does not mean "ordinary", but "common to every situation"
communibus locis	in common places	A term frequently used among philosophical and other writers, implying some medium, or mean relation between several places; one place with another; on a medium. "Common" here does not mean "ordinary", but "common to every situation"
communis opinio	common opinion	prevailing doctrine, generally accepted view (in an academic field), scientific consensus; originally communis opinio doctorum, "common opinion of the doctors"
compos mentis	in control of the mind	Describes someone of sound mind. Sometimes used ironically. Also a legal principle, non compos mentis (not in control of one's faculties), used to describe an insane person.
concilio et labore	by wisdom and effort	Motto of the city of Manchester
concordia cum veritate	in harmony with truth	Motto of the University of Waterloo
concordia salus	well-being through harmony	Motto of Montreal; Bank of Montreal coat of arms and motto
concordia parvae res crescunt	small things grow in harmony	Motto of the Worshipful Company of Merchant Taylors and the corresponding schools for girls and for boys, Crosby, and in Northwood.
condemnant quod non intellegunt	They condemn what they do not understand or They condemn because they do not understand	The quod here is ambiguous: it may be the relative pronoun or a conjunction.
condicio sine qua non	condition without which not	A required, indispensable condition. Commonly mistakenly rendered with conditio ("seasoning" or "preserving") in place of condicio ("arrangement" or "condition").
conditur in petra	it is founded on the rock	Motto of Peterhouse Boys' School and Peterhouse Girls' School
confer (cf.)	compare	The abbreviation cf. is used in text to suggest a comparison with something else (cf. citation signal).
Congregatio Sanctissimi Redemptoris C.Ss.R	Congregation of the Most Holy Redeemer	Redemptorists
coniunctis viribus	with connected strength	Or "with united powers". Sometimes rendered conjunctis viribus. Motto of Queen Mary, University of London.
consensu	with consent	
consuetudo pro lege servatur	Custom serves for law.	Where there are no specific laws, the matter should be decided by custom; established customs have the force of laws. Also consuetudo est altera lex (custom is another law) and consuetudo vincit communem legem (custom overrules the common law); see also: Consuetudinary.
consummatum est	It is completed.	The last words of Jesus on the cross in the Latin translation of John 19:30.
contemptus mundi/saeculi	scorn for the world/times	Despising the secular world. The monk or philosopher's rejection of a mundane life and worldly values.
contra bonos mores	against good morals	Offensive to the conscience and to a sense of justice.
contra legem	against law	Especially in civil law jurisdictions, said of an understanding of a statute that directly contradicts its wording and thus is valid neither by interpretation nor by analogy.
contra mundum	against the world	against public opinion; see also contra mundum injunction, enforceable against anyone, rather than a named party; Athanasius Contra Mundum, Athanasius of Alexandria, 4th-century Christian patriarch and theologian, exiled five times by four emperors.
contra proferentem	against the proferror	In contract law, the doctrine of contractual interpretation which provides that an ambiguous term will be construed against the party that imposed its inclusion in the contract – or, more accurately, against the interests of the party who imposed it.
contra spem spero	I hope against hope	Title of a poem by Lesya Ukrainka; it derives from an expression found in Paul's Letter to the Romans 4:18 (Greek: παρ' ἐλπίδα ἐπ' ἐλπίδι, Latin: contra spem in spe[m]) with reference to Abraham the Patriarch who maintained faith in becoming the father of many nations despite being childless and well-advanced in years.
contra vim mortis non crescit herba (or salvia) in hortis	No herb (or sage) grows in the gardens against the power of death	there is no medicine against death; from various medieval medicinal texts
contradictio in terminis	contradiction in terms	Something that would embody a contradiction with the very definition of one of its terms; for example, payment for a gift, or a circle with corners. The fallacy of proposing such a thing.
contra principia negantem non est disputandum	there can be no debate with those who deny the foundations	Debate is fruitless when you don't agree on common rules, facts, presuppositions.
cor ad cor loquitur	heart speaks to heart	From Augustine's Confessions, referring to a prescribed method of prayer: having a "heart to heart" with God. Commonly used in reference to a later quote by Cardinal John Henry Newman. A motto of Newman Clubs.
cor aut mors	Heart or Death	(Your choice is between) The Heart (Moral Values, Duty, Loyalty) or Death (to no longer matter, no longer to be respected as person of integrity.)
cor meum tibi offero domine prompte et sincere	my heart I offer to you Lord promptly and sincerely	John Calvin's personal motto, also adopted by Calvin College
cor unum	one heart	A popular school motto and often used as a name for religious and other organisations such as the Pontifical Council Cor Unum.
coram	in the presence of	Used before a list of the names of the judges on a panel hearing a particular case.
coram Deo	in the presence of God	A phrase from Christian theology which summarizes the idea of Christians living in the presence of, under the authority of, and to the honor and glory of God; see also coram Deo.
coram episcopo	in the presence of the bishop	Refers to the celebration of Mass in the Roman Catholic Church where the bishop is present but does not preside over the service. Cf. coram Summo Pontifice, in the presence of the Pope, in similar circumstances.
coram nobis, coram vobis	in our presence, in your presence	Two kinds of writs of error, calling for the decision to be reviewed by the same court that made it. Coram nobis is short for quae coram nobis resident (let them, i.e. the matters on the court record, remain before us), and was the form historically used for the Court of King's Bench; the "us" means the King, who was theoretically the head of that court. Coram vobis is the analogous version ("let the matters remain before you") for the Court of Common Pleas, where the King did not sit, even notionally.
coram non judice	not before a judge	legal proceeding that is outside the presence of a judge, thus a violation of the law and a nullity
coram populo	in the presence of the people	
coram publico	in view of the public	
Corpus Christi	Body of Christ	The name of a feast in the Roman Catholic Church commemorating the Eucharist. It is also the name of a city in Texas, Corpus Christi, Texas, the name of Colleges at Oxford and Cambridge universities, and a controversial play.
corpus delicti	body of the offence	The fact that a crime has been committed, a necessary factor in convicting someone of having committed that crime; if there was no crime, there can not have been a criminal.
Corpus Iuris Canonici	Body of Canon Law	The official compilation of canon law in the Roman Catholic Church (cf. Codex Iuris Canonici).
Corpus Juris Civilis	Body of Civil Law	The body of Roman or civil law.
corpus vile	worthless body	A person or thing fit only to be the object of an experiment, as in the phrase 'Fiat experimentum in corpore vili.'
corrigenda	things to be corrected	
corruptio optimi pessima	the corruption of the best is the worst	
corruptissima re publica plurimae leges	When the republic is at its most corrupt the laws are most numerous	Tacitus
corvus oculum corvi non eruit	a raven does not pick out an eye of another raven	
corruptus in extremis	corrupt to the extreme	Motto of the fictional Mayor's office in The Simpsons
cras amet qui nunquam amavit; quique amavit, cras amet	May he who has never loved before, love tomorrow; And may he who has loved, love tomorrow as well	The refrain from the 'Pervigilium Veneris', a poem which describes a three-day holiday in the cult of Venus, located somewhere in Sicily, involving the whole town in religious festivities joined with a deep sense of nature and Venus as the "procreatrix", the life-giving force behind the natural world.
cras es noster	Tomorrow, be ours	As "The Future is Ours", motto of San Jacinto College, Texas
creatio ex nihilo	creation out of nothing	A concept about creation, often used in a theological or philosophical context. Also known as the 'First Cause' argument in philosophy of religion. Contrasted with creatio ex materia.
Credo in Unum Deum	I Believe in One God	The first words of the Nicene Creed and the Apostles' Creed.
credo quia absurdum est	I believe it because it is absurd	A very common misquote of Tertullian's et mortuus est Dei Filius prorsus credibile quia ineptum est (and the Son of God is dead: in short, it is credible because it is unfitting), meaning that it is so absurd to say that God's son has died that it would have to be a matter of belief, rather than reason. The misquoted phrase, however, is commonly used to mock the dogmatic beliefs of the religious (see fideism). This phrase is commonly shortened to credo quia absurdum, and is also sometimes rendered credo quia impossibile est (I believe it because it is impossible) or, as Darwin used it in his autobiography, credo quia incredibile.
credo ut intelligam	I believe so that I may understand	A motto of St Anselm, used as the motto of St. Anselm Hall, Manchester
crescamus in Illo per omnia	May we grow in Him through all things	Motto of Cheverus High School
crescat scientia vita excolatur	let knowledge grow, let life be enriched	Motto of the University of Chicago; often rendered in English as an iambic tetrameter, "Let knowledge grow from more to more, and so be human life enriched".
crescente luce	Light ever increasing	Motto of James Cook University
Crescite et multiplicamini	Increase and multiply	Motto of Maryland until 1874
crescit cum commercio civitas	Civilization prospers with commerce	Motto of Claremont McKenna College.
crescit eundo	it grows as it goes	From Lucretius' De rerum natura book VI, where it refers in context to the motion of a thunderbolt across the sky, which acquires power and momentum as it goes. This metaphor was adapted as the state motto of New Mexico (adopted in 1887 as the territory's motto, and kept in 1912 when New Mexico received statehood) and is seen on the seal. Also the motto of Rocky Mount, Virginia and Omega Delta Phi.
cruci dum spiro fido	while I live, I trust in the cross, Whilst I trust in the Cross I have life	Motto of the Sisters of Loreto (IBVM) and its associated schools.
cucullus non facit monachum	The hood does not make the monk	William Shakespeare, Twelfth Night, act 1, scene 5, 53–54
cui bono	Good for whom?	"Who benefits?" An adage in criminal investigation which suggests that considering who would benefit from an unwelcome event is likely to reveal who is responsible for that event (cf. cui prodest). Also the motto of the Crime Syndicate of America, a fictional supervillain group. The opposite is cui malo (Bad for whom?).
cui multum sit datum, multum ab eo postulabitur	to whom much is given, much is expected	Motto of The Brooklyn Latin School. Taken from the Gospel of Luke 12:48.
cui prodest	for whom it advances	Short for cui prodest scelus is fecit (for whom the crime advances, he has done it) in Seneca's Medea. Thus, the murderer is often the one who gains by the murder (cf. cui bono).
cuique suum	to each his own	
cuius est solum, eius est usque ad coelum et ad inferos	Whose the land is, all the way to the sky and to the underworld is his.	First coined by Accursius of Bologna in the 13th century. A Roman legal principle of property law that is no longer observed in most situations today. Less literally, "For whosoever owns the soil, it is theirs up to the sky and down to the depths."
cuius regio, eius religio	whose region, his religion	The privilege of a ruler to choose the religion of his subjects. A regional prince's ability to choose his people's religion was established at the Peace of Augsburg in 1555.
cuiusvis hominis est errare, nullius nisi insipientis in errore perseverare.	Anyone can err, but only the fool persists in his fault	Cicero, Philippica XII, 5.
culpa	fault	Also "blame" or "guilt". In law, an act of neglect. In general, guilt, sin, or a fault. See also mea culpa.
Cum Deo pro Patria et Libertate	With God for Fatherland and Liberty	Appears on Francis II Rákóczi's flag
cum fontibus	with sources	e.g., Woltjer, Jan (1877). Lucretii philosophia cum fontibus comparata [Lucretius's philosophy, compared with its sources] (Thesis). Groningen: Noordhoff Uitgevers.
cum gladiis et fustibus	with swords and clubs	From the Bible. Occurs in Matthew 26:47 and Luke 22:52.
cum gladio et sale	with sword and salt	Motto of a well-paid soldier. See salary.
cum grano salis	with a grain of salt	Not to be taken too seriously or as the literal truth.
cum hoc ergo propter hoc	with this, therefore on account of this	Fallacy of assuming that correlation implies causation.
cum laude	with praise	The standard formula for academic Latin honors in the United States. Greater honors include magna cum laude and summa cum laude.
cum mortuis in lingua mortua	with the dead in a dead language	Movement from Pictures at an Exhibition by Modest Mussorgsky
cum privilegio ad imprimendum solum	with the exclusive right to print	Copyright notice used in 16th-century England, used for comic effect in The Taming of the Shrew by William Shakespeare where Lucentio is urged by his servant Biondello to "seize your privilege to declare her [Bianca] yours alone".
cum tempore (c.t.)	with time	academic custom to start lectures 15 minutes later than advertised; sine tempore (s.t.) indicates lectures start on time.
cuncti adsint meritaeque expectent praemia palmae	let all come who by merit deserve the most reward	Motto of University College London.
cupio dissolvi	desire to be dissolved	From the Bible, locution indicating a will to death ("I want to die").
cur Deus Homo	Why the God-Man	The question attributed to Anselm in his work of by this name, wherein he reflects on why the Christ of Christianity must be both fully Divine and fully Human. Often translated "why did God become Man?"
cura personalis	care for the whole person	Motto of Georgetown University School of Medicine and University of Scranton
cura te ipsum	take care of your own self	Exhortation to physicians, or experts in general, to deal with their own problems before addressing those of others
curriculum vitae	course of life	An overview of a person's life and qualifications, similar to a résumé
custodi civitatem, Domine	guard the city, O Lord	Motto of the City of Westminster
custos morum	keeper of morals	A censor
cygnis insignis	distinguished by its swans	Motto of Western Australia
cygnus inter anates	swan among ducks	
