= Nulla poena sine lege =

Latin doctrine meaning "no penalty without law"

Nulla poena sine lege (Latin for "no penalty without law", Anglicized pronunciation: /ˈnʌlə ˈpiːnə ˈsaɪniː ˈliːdʒiː/ NUL-ə PEE-nə SY-nee LEE-jee) is a legal formula which, in its narrow interpretation, states that one can only be punished for doing something if a penalty for this behavior is fixed in criminal law. As some laws are unwritten (e.g. in oral law or customary law) and laws can be interpreted broadly, it does not necessarily mean that an action will not be punished simply because a specific rule against it is not codified.

The variant nullum crimen sine lege ("no crime without law") establishes that conduct is not criminal if not found among the behavior/circumstance combinations of a statute. The other interpretations of the formula include the rules prohibiting retroactive criminalization and prescribing laws to be strictly construed.

Despite the use of Latin language and brocard-like appearance, the formula was mostly born in 18th century liberalism (some elements of non-retroactivity of laws and limiting the punishment to the one prescribed in the statute date back to Roman times). This principle is accepted and codified in modern democratic states as a basic requirement of the rule of law. It has been described as "one of the most 'widely held value-judgement[s] in the entire history of human thought'".

== Requirements ==
In modern European criminal law, e.g. of the Constitutional Court of Germany, the principle of nulla poena sine lege has been found to consist of four separate requirements:

Nulla poena sine lege praevia
There is to be no penalty without previous law. This prohibits ex post facto laws, and the retroactive application of criminal law. It is a basic maxim in mainland European legal thinking. It was written by Paul Johann Anselm Ritter von Feuerbach as part of the Bavarian Criminal Code in 1813.
Nulla poena sine lege scripta
There is to be no penalty without written law. That is, criminal prohibitions must be set out in written legal instruments of general application, normally statutes, adopted in the form required by constitutional law. This excludes customary law as a basis of criminal punishment.
Nulla poena sine lege certa
There is to be no penalty without well-defined law. This provides that a penal statute must define the punishable conduct and the penalty with sufficient definiteness. This to allow citizens to foresee when a specific action would be punishable, and to conduct themselves accordingly, a rule expressed in the general principle of legal certainty in matters of criminal law. It is recognised or codified in many national jurisdictions, as well as e.g. by the European Court of Justice as a "general principle of Union law".
Nulla poena sine lege stricta
There is to be no penalty without exact law. This prohibits the application by analogy of statutory provisions in criminal law.

== In common law ==
One complexity is the lawmaking power of judges under common law. Even in civil law systems that do not admit judge-made law, it is not always clear when the function of interpretation of the criminal law ends and judicial lawmaking begins.

In English criminal law there are offences of common law origin. For example, murder is still a common law offence and lacks a statutory definition. The Homicide Act 1957 did not include a statutory definition of murder (or any other homicidal offence). Therefore, the definition of murder was the subject of no fewer than six appeals to the House of Lords within the following 40 years (Director of Public Prosecutions v. Smith [1961] A.C. 290; Hyam v. Director of Public Prosecutions [1975] A.C. 55; Regina v. Cunningham [1982] A.C. 566; Regina v. Moloney [1985] A.C. 905; Regina v. Hancock [1986] A.C. 455; Regina v. Woollin [1998] 4 A11 E.R. 103 (H.L.)).

== In natural law ==
The legal principle nulla poena sine lege as principle in natural law is due to the contention of scholars of the Scholasticism about the preconditions of a guilty conscience. In relation to the Ezekiel-commentary of Jerome, Thomas Aquinas and Francisco Suárez analysed the formal conditions of the punishment of conscience. Aquinas located the conditions within the synderesis. For him it is a formal and active part of the human soul. Understanding of activity, which is in accordance with the human nature, is formally possible due to the synderesis. Hence the synderesis contains in the works of patristic authors a law which commands how the human as human has to act. In the individual case this law is contentually definite. For the Scholastic this is shown in the action of the intellect. This action is named since Aquinas conscientia. A possible content of the conscientia is the punishment in concordance with the content of the synderesis, in case the human has had not act in concordance with the human nature. An example for the punishment is madness, which since antiquity is a punishment of conscience. The Oresteia is a famous example for this.

According Suárez the punishment of conscience is the insight in an obligation to act in concordance with the human nature to undo a past misdeed. This insight obligates to impossible actions due to the fact that the misdeed is in the past and hence it is unchangeable. Therefore the conscientia obligates in concordance with the synderesis to do an impossible action. Hence the conscientia restricts conscientious persons by doing a limitation on their own will. For they are unable to think about any other action than to fulfil their obligation. Inasmuch the conscientia restricts the intellect the Scholastic speak of it as a malum or malum metaphysicum, because the limitation is related to a metaphysical quality of a human. The law is constituted by the human nature itself from what the malum metaphysicum is inflicted. Therefore the punishment of the conscience is executed because of a violation of natural law.

When coming to terms with the Nazi crimes after World War II in Austria, the Austrian legal scholar and judge Wilhelm Malaniuk justified the admissibility of the non-application of the "nulla poena sine lege" with regard to the Austrian Verbotsgesetz 1947: "Because these are crimes that are so grossly violate the laws of humanity!" Regarding war crimes law and war crimes related to command structures, Malaniuk said: “In the war instigated by the National Socialists, the requirements of humanity as well as the principles of international law and martial law were violated to such an extent that it was no longer just the government that was believed to be responsible for this, but also the individual citizens, because they knew had to that their actions grossly violate the principles, compliance with which must be demanded from every member of the occidental culture."

== In cases of universal jurisdiction ==
The question of jurisdiction may sometimes come to contradict this principle. For example, customary international law allows the prosecution of pirates by any country (applying universal jurisdiction), even if they did not commit crimes at the area that falls under this country's law. A similar principle has appeared in the recent decades with regard to crimes of genocide (see genocide as a crime under domestic law); and UN Security Council Resolution 1674 "reaffirms the provisions of paragraphs 138 and 139 of the 2005 World Summit Outcome Document regarding the responsibility to protect populations from genocide, war crimes, ethnic cleansing and crimes against humanity" even if the State in which the population is being assaulted does not recognise these assaults as a breach of domestic law. However, it seems that universal jurisdiction is not to be expanded substantially to other crimes, so as to satisfy Nulla poena sine lege.

Since the Nuremberg Trials, penal law is taken to include the prohibitions of international criminal law, in addition to those of domestic law. Thus, prosecutions have been possible of such individuals as Nazi war criminals and officials of the German Democratic Republic responsible for the Berlin Wall, even though their deeds may have been allowed or even ordered by domestic law. Also, courts when dealing with such cases will tend to look to the letter of the law at the time, even in regimes where the law as it was written was generally disregarded in practice by its own authors.

However, some legal scholars criticize this, because generally, in the legal systems of mainland Europe where the maxim was first developed, "penal law" was taken to mean statutory penal law, so as to create a guarantee to the individual, considered as a fundamental right, that he would not be prosecuted for an action or omission that was not considered a crime according to the statutes passed by the legislators in force at the time of the action or omission, and that only those penalties that were in place when the infringement took place would be applied. Also, even if one considers that certain actions are prohibited under general principles of international law, critics point out that a prohibition in a general principle does not amount to the establishment of a crime, and that the rules of international law also do not stipulate specific penalties for the violations.

In an attempt to address those criticisms, the statute of the recently established International Criminal Court provides for a system in which crimes and penalties are expressly set out in written law, that shall only be applied to future cases. See Article 22 of the Rome Statute; however this is under the proviso, in Article 22(3) that this only applies to the ICC, and "shall not affect the characterization of any conduct as criminal under international law independently of [the Rome Statute]".

The principle of nulla poena sine lege, insofar as it applies to general criminal law, is enshrined in several national constitutions, and international instruments, see European Convention on Human Rights, article 7(1). However, when applied to international criminal/humanitarian law, the same legal instruments often allow for ex post facto application of the law. See ECHR, article 7(2), which states that article 7(1) "shall not prejudice the trial and punishment of any person for any act or omission which, at the time when it was committed, was criminal according to the general principles of law recognised by civilised nations."

== See also ==
- Everything which is not forbidden is allowed
- Ex post facto law
- List of Latin legal terms
- Nulla poena sine culpa
- Principle of legality in criminal law
- Radbruch formula
- Rechtsstaat
- Riom Trial (1942–1943)
