= Aphorism =

Figure of speech

An aphorism (from Greek ἀφορισμός: aphorismos, denoting 'delimitation', 'distinction', and 'definition') is a concise, terse, laconic, or memorable expression of a general truth or principle. Aphorisms are often handed down by tradition from generation to generation.

The concept is generally distinct from those of an adage, brocard, chiasmus, epigram, maxim (legal or philosophical), principle, proverb, and saying; although some of these concepts could be construed as types of aphorism.

Often aphorisms are distinguished from other short sayings by the need for interpretation to make sense of them. In A Theory of the Aphorism, Andrew Hui defined an aphorism as "a short saying that requires interpretation".

A famous example is:

You cannot step into the same river twice.

— Heraclitus

== History ==
The word was first used in the Aphorisms of Hippocrates, a long series of propositions concerning the symptoms and diagnosis of disease and the art of healing and medicine. The often-cited first sentence of this work is: "Ὁ βίος βραχύς, ἡ δὲ τέχνη μακρή" – "life is short, art is long", usually reversed in order (Ars longa, vita brevis).

This aphorism was later applied or adapted to physical science and then morphed into multifarious aphorisms of philosophy, morality, and literature. Currently, an aphorism is generally understood to be a concise and eloquent statement of truth.

Aphorisms are distinct from axioms: aphorisms generally originate from experience and custom, whereas axioms are self-evident truths and therefore require no additional proof. Aphorisms have been especially used in subjects to which no methodical or scientific treatment was originally applied, such as agriculture, medicine, jurisprudence, and politics.

== Literature ==
Aphoristic collections, sometimes known as wisdom literature, have a prominent place in the canons of several ancient societies, such as the Sutra literature of India, the Biblical Ecclesiastes, Islamic hadiths, the golden verses of Pythagoras, Hesiod's Works and Days, the Delphic maxims, and Epictetus' Handbook. Aphoristic collections also make up an important part of the work of some modern authors. A 1559 oil–on–oak-panel painting, Netherlandish Proverbs (also called The Blue Cloak or The Topsy Turvy World) by Pieter Bruegel the Elder, artfully depicts a land populated with literal renditions of Flemish aphorisms (proverbs) of the day.

The first noted published collection of aphorisms is Adagia by Erasmus. Other important early aphorists were Baltasar Gracián, François de La Rochefoucauld, and Blaise Pascal.

Two influential collections of aphorisms published in the twentieth century were Unkempt Thoughts by Stanisław Jerzy Lec (in Polish) and Itch of Wisdom by Mikhail Turovsky (in Russian and English).

== Society ==
Many societies have traditional sages or culture heroes to whom aphorisms are commonly attributed, such as the Seven Sages of Greece, Chanakya, Confucius, or King Solomon.

Misquoted or misadvised aphorisms are frequently used as a source of humour; for instance, wordplays of aphorisms appear in the works of P. G. Wodehouse, Terry Pratchett, and Douglas Adams. Aphorisms being misquoted by sports players, coaches, and commentators form the basis of Private Eye's Colemanballs section.

== Philosophy ==
Professor of Humanities Andrew Hui, author of A Theory of the Aphorism offered the following definition of an aphorism: "a short saying that requires interpretation". Hui showed that some of the earliest philosophical texts from traditions around the world used an aphoristic style. Some of the earliest texts in the western philosophical canon feature short statements requiring interpretation, as seen in the Pre-Socratics like Heraclitus and Parmenides. In early Hindu literature, the Vedas were composed of many aphorisms. Likewise, in early Chinese philosophy, Taoist texts like the Tao Te Ching and the Confucian Analects relied on an aphoristic style. Francis Bacon, Blaise Pascal, Desiderius Erasmus, Arthur Schopenhauer and Friedrich Nietzsche rank among some of the most notable philosophers who employed them in the modern time.

Andrew Hui argued that aphorisms played an important role in the history of philosophy, influencing the favored mediums of philosophical traditions. He argued for example, that the Platonic Dialogues served as a response to the difficult to interpret fragments and phrases which Pre-Socratic philosophers were famous for. Hui proposes that aphorisms often arrive before, after, or in response to more systematic argumentative philosophy. For example, aphorisms may come before a systematic philosophy, because the systematic philosophy consists of the attempt to interpret and explain the aphorisms, as he argues is the case with Confucianism. Alternately, aphorisms may be written against systematic philosophy, as a form of challenge or irreverence, as seen in Nietzsche's work. Lastly, aphorisms may come after or following systematic philosophy, as was the case with Francis Bacon, who sought to bring an end to old ways of thinking.

== Aphorists ==
- Theodor W. Adorno (Minima Moralia: Reflections from Damaged Life)
- Georges Bataille
- Jean Baudrillard
- Ambrose Bierce (The Devil's Dictionary)
- George E. P. Box
- F. H. Bradley
- Burchard of Worms
- Malcolm de Chazal
- Cheng Yen (Jing Si Aphorism)
- Emil Cioran
- Arkady Davidowitz
- Nicolás Gómez Dávila (Escolios a un texto implícito)
- Desiderius Erasmus
- Gustave Flaubert (Dictionary of Received Ideas)
- Benjamin Franklin
- Andrzej Maksymilian Fredro
- Joan Fuster
- Kahlil Gibran
- Jan Greshoff
- Robert A. Heinlein (The Notebooks of Lazarus Long)
- Edmond Jabès
- Tomáš Janovic
- Joseph Joubert
- Franz Kafka
- Karl Kraus
- Lao Tze
- Stanisław Jerzy Lec
- Georg Christoph Lichtenberg
- Andrzej Majewski
- Juan Manuel (the second, third and fourth parts of his famous work El Conde Lucanor)
- Friedrich Nietzsche
- Oiva Paloheimo
- Dorothy Parker
- Patanjali
- Petar II Petrović-Njegoš
- Faina Ranevskaya
- François de La Rochefoucauld
- George Santayana
- Arthur Schopenhauer
- Seneca the Younger
- George Bernard Shaw
- Lev Shestov
- Sun Tzu
- Nassim Nicholas Taleb (The Bed of Procrustes)
- Mikhail Turovsky
- Mark Twain
- Voltaire
- Wasif Ali Wasif
- Oscar Wilde
- Alexander Woollcott

== See also ==
- Adagia by Desiderius Erasmus Roterodamus
- Brocard – Legal principle expressed in Latin
- Chiasmus – Reversal of grammatical structures in successive phrases
- Epigram – Brief memorable statement
- Epitaph – Inscription on a tombstone
- French moralists – Secular writers who described "personal, social and political conduct" through maxims
- Gospel of Thomas – Extra-canonical sayings gospel
- Greguería
- Legal maxim – Established principle of law
- Mahavakya – Aspect of the Upanishads
- Maxim – Rule or guideline for action
- Proverb – Traditional saying that reveals a thought truth
- Pseudo-Phocylides – Ancient apocryphal text
- Sacred Scripture:
  - Book of Proverbs – Book of the Bible
  - Ecclesiastes – Book of the Hebrew Bible (450–180 BCE)
  - Hidden Words – Baháʼí scripture, written by Baháʼu'lláh around 1858
  - Wisdom of Sirach – Deuterocanonical book (200–175 BCE)
- Saying – Concise expression memorable for its meaning
- Sūtra – Text in Hinduism, Buddhism, or Jainism, often a collection of aphorisms
- The Triads of Ireland, and the Welsh Triads
