= Brocard (law) =

Legal principle expressed in Latin

A brocard is a legal maxim in Latin that is, in a strict sense, derived from traditional legal authorities, even from ancient Rome.

== History ==
According to the dictionaries, the word is a variant of the Latinized name of Burchard of Worms (died AD 1025), Bishop of Worms, Germany, who compiled 20 volumes of Ecclesiastical Rules, although some sources disagree. Begun in AD 1008, the materials took Burchard four years to compile. He wrote it while living in a small structure on top of a hill in the forest outside Worms, after his defeat of Duke Otto and while raising his adopted child. The collection, which he called the Collectarium Canonum or Decretum, became a primary source for canon law.

Along with numerous documents from a variety of sources, including the Old Testament and Saint Augustine of Hippo, Burchard included the Canon Episcopi in this collection, under the belief that it dated from an episcopal "Council of Anquira" in AD 314, but no other evidence of this council exists. Because of this inclusion, Burchard has been described as something of a rationalist. As the source of canon law, Burchard's Decretum was supplanted around 1150 by the Decretum Gratiani, a much larger collection that further attempted to reconcile contradictory elements of canon law.

Burchard spent the years 1023 to 1025 promulgating Leges et Statuta Familiae S. Petri Wormatiensis, a collection of religious laws he endorsed as just and hoped to have officially approbated.

Spargo points out that early compilations of brocards sometimes contained miscellaneous trivia in Latin, and a hard association of the term "brocard" with a legal maxim came later. As an example, he quotes a 1521 work published in Toulouse: Latin: Armaria est locus ubi libri reponuntur (a bookcase is a place where the books are returned).

Although the Romans first came to Britain in 55 BC, Roman Law has had negligible influence on English common law. Latin legal phrases are used in English only because Latin was the lingua franca of the Medieval era. Although some of these phrases are in common use in law, such as res ipsa loquitur, novus actus interveniens, talem qualem, de minimis non curat lex, and consensus ad idem, the common law is not premised on the principles of civil law, and their use is being replaced by that of vernacular substitutes. For example, Black's Law Dictionary previously included numerous brocards among its entries.

Although the Romans did not conquer Scotland, Scots Law is a mixed legal system in which "brocards are regarded as part of the common law".

=== Etymology ===
Multiple sources, including the Oxford English Dictionary, derive the term from the name of Bishop Burkhardt, although contemporaneous Medieval Latin spelling was typically Burkhardus. Spargo in 1948 pointed out that Friedrich Carl von Savigny, an 18th-century authority on canon law, declared association to be solely due to a similarity in sound, and stated that the origin of the term is "very uncertain". So did the Encyclopédie des sciences ecclésiastiques in 1937.

== Examples ==
Actori incumbit onus probatio
"On the plaintiff rests the proving". The burden of proof falls to the plaintiff, claimant, or petitioner.
Actio libera in causa
"Action free in its cause". A person who voluntarily and deliberately gets himself into circumstances where he involuntary commits a crime (say, kills someone while driving drunk).
Audi alteram partem or audiatur et altera pars
"Listen to the other side", or "let the other side be heard as well". Refers to the idea that one cannot be fairly judged unless the cases for and against them have been heard.
Casum sentit dominus or res perit domino
"Accident is felt by the owner". The owner has to assume the risk of accidental harm to him or accidental loss to his property.
Cogitationis poenam nemo patitur
"No one suffers punishment for mere intent." A crime is only committed through some act, not through a mere thought.
Consensus facit legem
"Consensus makes law". Stipulates that when two or more persons arrive at a good faith agreement, the law will insist on that agreement being carried out.
Consuetudo pro lege servatur
"Custom is held as law." Where no laws apply to a given situation, the customs of the place and time will have the force of law.
Contra non valentem agere nulla [or non] currit praescriptio
A statute of limitation does not run against those who cannot act; this is the basis of the American discovery rule limiting prescriptive limitation periods.
Cuius est solum eius est usque ad coelum et ad inferos
"Whoever's is the soil, all the way to heaven and to the depths is theirs." Used in reference to the rights of property owners to the air above, and land below, their property.
Delegatus non potest delegare
"That which has been delegated cannot delegate further."
De minimis non curat lex
"The law does not concern itself with the smallest things". There must be a minimal level of substance or impact in order to bring a legal action.
Dubia in meliorem partem interpretari debent
"Doubtful things should be interpreted in the best way." Often spoken as "to give the benefit of the doubt".
Dura lex, sed lex
"The law [is] harsh, but [it is] the law." It follows from the principle of the rule of law that even draconian laws must be followed and enforced; if one disagrees with the result, one must seek to change the law.
Ei incumbit probatio qui dicit
"Proof lies on the one who asserts."
Ex factis jus oritur
"The law arises from the facts." A principle in international law that one must take facts on the ground into account when considering the legality of certain kinds of questions.
Expressio unius est exclusio alterius
"The express mention of one thing excludes all others." When items are listed, anything not explicitly stated is assumed to not be included.
Ex turpi causa non oritur actio
"From a dishonorable cause an action does not arise." A party cannot bring a legal action for consequences of his own illegal act.
Fiat justitia et pereat mundus
"Let there be justice, though the world perish." Often used as a motto, notably by Ferdinand I, Holy Roman Emperor.
Fiat justitia ruat caelum
"Let justice be done though the heavens fall." Also sometimes a motto, a legal maxim that justice must be done regardless of the result otherwise.
Generalia specialibus non derogant
"The general does not detract from the specific." Specifies that a certain matter of law must be covered by the most specific laws pertaining, in the event that broader laws conflict with the specific one.
Ignorantia juris non excusat
"Ignorance of the law is no excuse."
In claris non fit interpretatio
"In clear things no interpretation is made." When a rule is clearly intelligible, there is no need of proposing a (usually extensive) interpretation.
Inadimplenti non est adimplendum
"One has no need to respect his obligation if the counter-party has not respected his own." This is used in civil law to briefly indicate a principle (adopted in some systems) referred to as the synallagmatic contract.
Inter arma enim silent leges
"For among arms, the laws fall silent." A concept that during war, many illegal activities occur. Also taken to mean that in times of war, laws are suppressed, ostensibly for the good of the country.
Iudex non calculat
"The judge does not calculate." A principle that calculation errors made by the court do not invalidate the judgement on a technicality. Also taken to mean that the judge does not tally up the arguments of both sides and decide in favor of the more numerous, but rather weighs all of the evidence without regard to the number of arguments made.
Iura novit curia
"The court knows the law." Concept that parties to a case do not need to define how the law applies to their case. The court is solely responsible for determining what laws apply.
Ius civile vigilantibus scriptum est
"Civil law is written for the vigilant". It emphasises that private law is written for people who are vigilant in pursuing their interests and diligently care for their own affairs.
Leges humanae nascuntur, vivunt, moriuntur
"The laws of man are born, live, and die." Illustrates that laws are made, are in force for a period, and then become obsolete.
Lex posterior derogat priori
"A later law repeals an earlier one." More recent law overrules older law on the same matter.
Lex retro non agit
"The law does not operate retroactively." A law cannot make something illegal that was legal at the time it was performed. See ex post facto law.
Lex specialis derogat legi generali
"A law governing a specific subject matter overrides a law which only governs general matters."
Maleficia propositis distinguuntur
"Evil acts are distinguished from (evil) purposes" or "crimes are distinguished by evil intent".
Nemo auditur propriam turpitudinem allegans
"No one can be heard, who invokes his own guilt." Nobody can bring a case that stems from their own illegal act.
Nemo dat quod non habet
"No one gives what they do not have." The basic rule that a person who does not own property (e.g. a thief) cannot confer it on another except with the true owner's authority (i.e. as his agent). Exceptions to this rule include sales under statutory powers, and cases where the doctrine of estoppel prevents a legal owner from denying a seller's right to sell.
Nemo debet esse iudex in propria
"No one shall be a judge in his own case." In the past it was thought that it included just two rules, namely (1) nemo iudex in causa sua (no one shall be a judge in his own case).
Nemo ius ignoratur censetur
"Not knowing the law is harmful." Everyone should know the law. This is used in European Law-countries with a history of Roman law; the 'sentence' was first made by Aristotle.
Nemo judex in sua causa
"No one shall be a judge in his own case." Prevents conflict of interest in courts. Often invoked when there is really no conflict, but when there is even the appearance of one.
Nemo plus iuris ad alium transferre potest quam ipse habet
"No one can transfer a greater right than he himself has." A purchaser of stolen goods will not become the rightful owner thereof, since the seller himself was not the owner to begin with.
Non faciat malum, ut inde veniat bonum
"Not to do evil that good may come." Performing some illegal action is not excused by the fact that a positive result came therefrom. Often used to argue that some forms of expression, such as graffiti or pornographic films, cannot be given the protection of law (e.g. copyright) as they are or may be considered illegal or morally reprehensible.
Nulla poena sine culpa
"No punishment without fault." A person can not be punished for a crime that they are not guilty of.
Nulla poena sine lege or nullum crimen, nulla poena sine praevia lege poenali
"No penalty without law" or "no crime, no punishment without a previous penal law". (1) One cannot be prosecuted for doing something that is not prohibited by law. (2) One cannot be prosecuted for doing something that was not prohibited by law at the time and place it was committed, notwithstanding laws made since that time. A form of prohibition on retroactive laws.
Nunc pro tunc
"Now for then." The form of a current order intended to be effective retroactively.
Pacta sunt servanda
"Agreements are to be kept." Contracts are the law or contracts establish obligations (between those who sign them).
Par in parem non habet imperium
"Equals have no sovereignty over each other."
Prior tempore potior iure
"Earlier in time, stronger in right." "The law favors those who establish their rights earlier rather than later."
Prius quam exaudias ne iudices
"Before you hear, do not judge."
Probatio vincit praesumptionem
"Proof overcomes presumption."
Prout patet per recordum
"As appears in the record". Used to cite something that has already been admitted into the record. It was frequently used in pleadings, generally abbreviated "prout &c.", to indicate that a fact was supported by documentary evidence. Failure to use this phrase correctly could be a fatal defect and so cause a case to fail.
Qui facit per alium facit per se
"Who acts through another, acts himself." One who delegates a task to another, takes full responsibility for the performance of that act as if he himself had done it. Basis for the law of agency.
Quod est necessarium est licitum
"What is necessary is lawful."
Quod non est in registro, non est in Mundo
"What is not in the register is not in the world." What is not reported in the (related, referring) registry, has no legal relevance. Used when a formal act (usually a recording or a transcription) is required in order to give consistence, content or efficacy to a right.
Res ipsa loquitur
"The thing speaks for itself." Used in tort/delict law when there is no proof of what caused the harm, but it is most likely only the thing that could have caused the harm.
Res inter alios acta vel iudicata, aliis nec nocet nec prodocet
What has been agreed/decided between people (a specific group) can neither benefit nor harm a third party (meaning: two or more people cannot agree amongst each other to establish an obligation for a third party who was not involved in the negotiation; furthermore, any benefit that may be established will have to be accepted by the third party before it can be implemented).
Rex non potest peccare
"The king can do no wrong." Used to describe the basis for sovereign immunity.
Salus populi suprema lex esto
"The good of the people shall be the supreme law." Used variously as a motto, a reminder, or a notion of how the law and governments in general should be.
Sententia quae in rem iudicatam transit, pro veritate habetur
When a definitive sentence is declared, it is considered to be the truth. In the case of a sentence in rem iudicatam (that finally consents to consider a judgement completed), its content will then be the only legally relevant consideration of a fact.
Sic utere tuo ut alienum non laedas
"Use your property so as not to injure that of your neighbours." While an individual is entitled to the use and enjoyment of one's estate, the right is not without limits. Restrictions can give rise to tort/delict actions including trespass, negligence, and nuisance.
Solve et repete
"Solve and resume." Respect your obligation first, then you can ask for reimbursement. Used in those situations in which one of the two (or more) parties needs to complete his obligation before being allowed to ask for the opposite obligation to be respected by his counter party. Usually this principle is used in fields and subjects in which a certain general steadiness or uniformity of the system is considered a particularly relevant value. The case is typical of service contracts with repeated obligations (like with gas, water, electricity providers and similars), in which irregularities on one side cannot be balanced if not in a regular situation (i.e., of payments) on the other side. The customer, for example, might be asked to pay regularly the new bill, before contesting the previous one in which he found irregular calculations, and asking for a balancement with newer bills; he thus cannot by himself determine a discount in the next payment.
Ubi lex voluit, dixit; ubi noluit, tacuit
"When the law wills, it speaks; when it does not will, it is silent." When the law wants to regulate a matter in further detail, it does regulate the matter; when it does not want to regulate a matter in further detail, it remained silent.
Ultra posse nemo obligatur
"No one is obligated (to do) more than he can." Specifies that one should do what he can to support the community, but since everyone has different levels of ability, it cannot be expected that all will perform the same.
Vigilantibus non dormientibus aequitas subvenit
"Equity aids the vigilant, not the sleeping." Concept that if an opposing party unreasonably delays bringing an action, that it is no longer considered just to hear their claim, due to fundamental changes in circumstance brought on by their delay.
Volenti non fit injuria
"Injury is not done to the willing." Notion that a person cannot bring a claim against another for injury, if said person willingly placed themselves in a situation where they knew injury could result.

== See also ==
- Legal maxim
- List of legal Latin terms
- Maxims of equity
