= Ramón Gómez de la Serna =

Spanish writer (1888–1963)

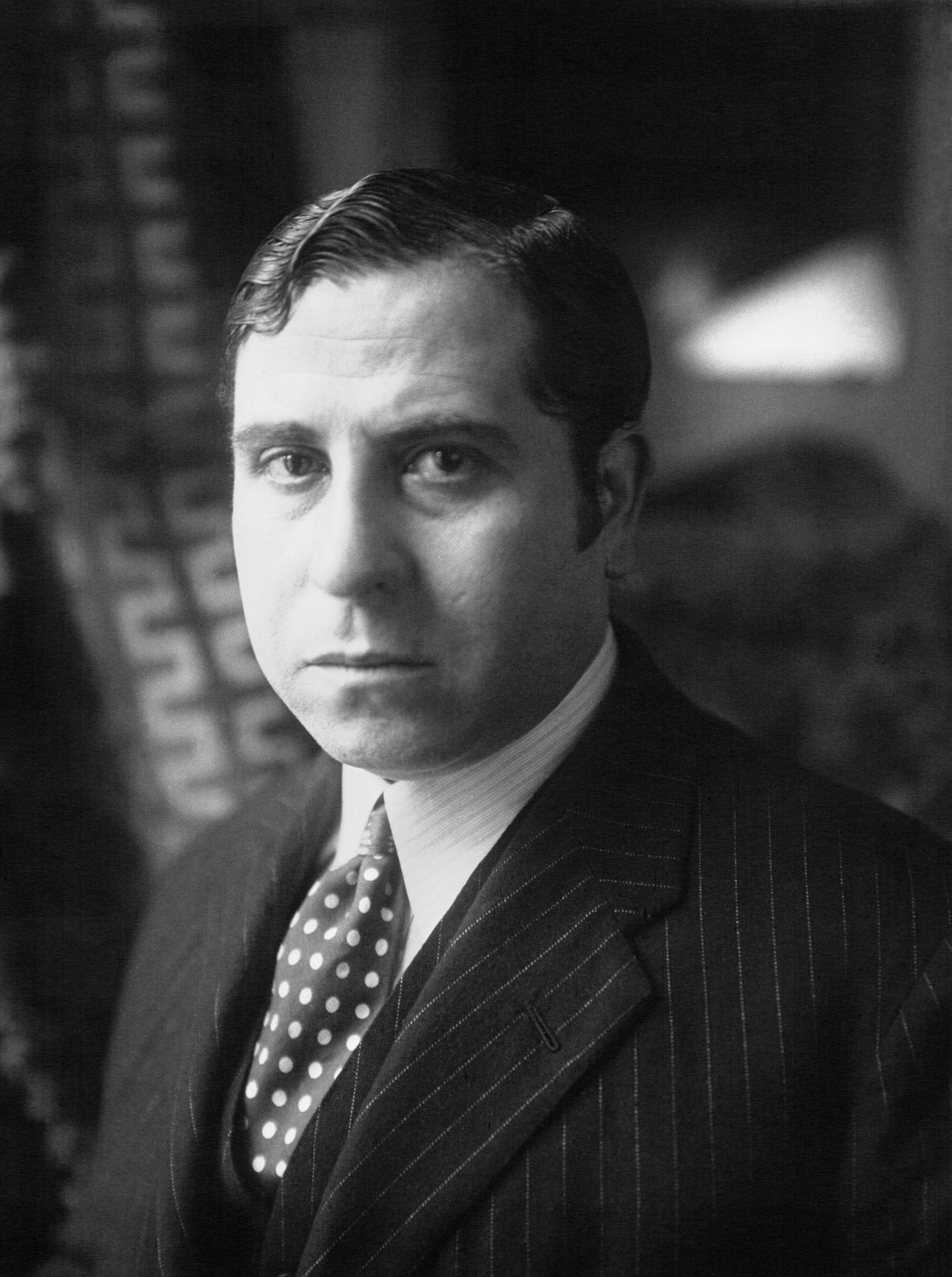
Ramón Gómez de la Serna, ca 1928

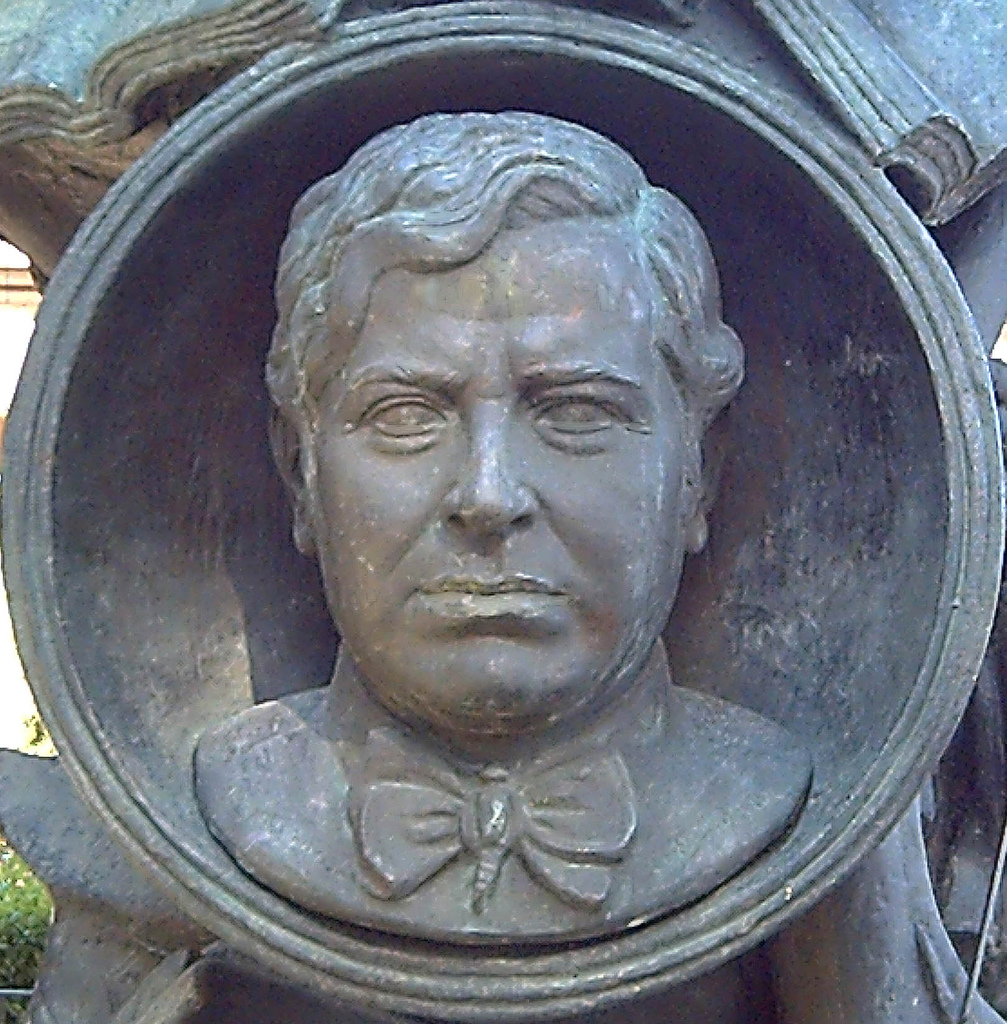
Bronze bust of R. Gómez de la Serna. Detail of the monument to him in Madrid (E. Pérez, 1972).

Ramón Gómez de la Serna y Puig (July 3, 1888 – January 13, 1963), born in Madrid, was a Spanish writer, dramatist and avant-garde agitator. He strongly influenced surrealist film maker Luis Buñuel.

Ramón Gómez de la Serna was especially known for "Greguería", a short form of poetry that roughly corresponds to the one-liner in comedy. The Gregueria is especially able to grant a new and often humorous perspective. Serna published over 90 works in all literary genres. In 1933, he was invited to Buenos Aires. He stayed there through the Spanish Civil War and the following Spanish State till the end of his life.

== Biography ==
Born into an upper-middle-class family, Gómez de la Serna refused to follow his father into law or politics and soon adopted the marginal lifestyle of a bohemian bourgeois artist, writing for the journal Prometeo, funded by his father between 1908 and 1912. In April 1909 Gómez de la Serna published the manifesto of futurism in the magazine which was translated by him into Spanish.

During the First World War, Gómez became Spain's chief exponent of avant-garde writing, establishing a base in the literary tertulia he founded at the centre of Madrid.

This was Spain's most famous contribution to what Roger Shattuck has called "the banquet years". In addition to his support of the avant-garde, Gómez developed an extravagant public persona, and his own equivalent of what Shattuck defines as a "reversal of consciousness", deliberately divesting himself of conventional ways of thinking and being in order to adopt a peculiarly innovative way of looking at the world, one which influenced the younger 1927 generation of poets (as Luis Cernuda has explained).

The six or so books he published from 1914 to 1918 – El Rastro (The Flea-Market), El Doctor Inverosímil (The Improbable Doctor), Greguerías (Greguerias), Senos (Breasts), Pombo (Pombo), and El circo (The Circus) – illustrate most of his main characteristics: his search for a new fragmentary genre of short prose poems (giving them the arbitrary name of greguerías), his exaltation of trivial everyday objects, his emphasis on eroticism, his exuberant self-projection and exclusive dedication to art, his playful humour, his contemplative secular mysticism, and above all his cult of the image, especially witty surprising images.

These abound in all his works, especially his many, utterly idiosyncratic and textually pleasurable novels, such as the first real one La viuda blanca y negra (The Black and White Widow), written in 1921, inspired by his relationship with the early feminist writer, Carmen de Burgos.

It was in fact the greguerías that first attracted the attention of Valery Larbaud, who in the 1920s soon had him translated into French.

Within Spain, though his work often provoked controversy and sometimes hostility, one of his most eminent defenders was José Ortega y Gasset. Subsequently, unorganized consensus in mainstream Hispanism deemed Gómez's work to have been overrated.

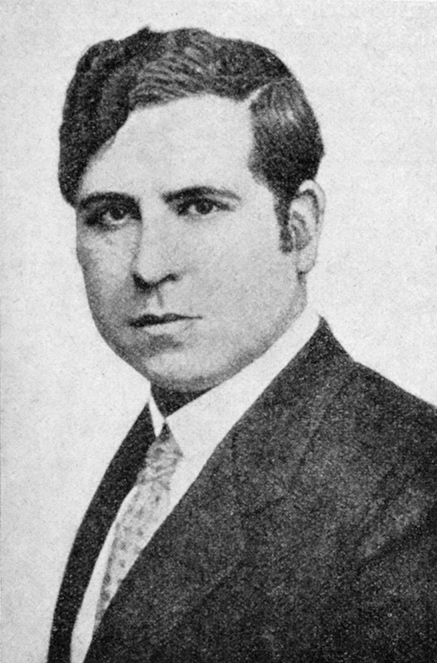
ca 1931

Gómez's lack of commitment during the Republic, followed by his declaration of support for Franco after self-exile to his younger, Jewish wife's flat in Buenos Aires at the outbreak of civil war, led to ostracism and neglect.

Despite still producing some of the most original works in Spanish of the twentieth century – the existential-surrealist novel El hombre perdido (The Lost Man) (1947) and his autobiography Automoribundia (Automoribund) [1948] – his life in exile was one of pathetic isolation and increasing poverty, neither of which were helped by the knowledge that he had left behind (and in 1947 donated to the Spanish State) the painting of the Pombo Tertulia by José Gutiérrez Solana (now given pride of place in Madrid's Reina Sofia Museum), in addition to the cubist portrait of him painted in 1915 by Diego Rivera (which was lost during the civil war, but has apparently resurfaced). On 13 January 1963 Gómez died from natural causes. In a letter to one of his companions, he mentions acknowledging his imminent death and welcomed it.

Despite the decline in Gómez's reputation, two notable voices in particular declared their admiration: Octavio Paz, who wrote the following in a letter to Papeles de Son Armadans in 1967: 'Para mí es el gran escritor español: el Escritor o, mejor, la Escritura. Comparto la admiración, el fanatismo, de Larbaud: yo también habría aprendido el español sólo para leerlo’ (For me he is the great Spanish writer: the Writer, or rather, Writing. I share Larbaud’s admiration, his fanaticism: I also would have learned Spanish just to read him), and Pablo Neruda, who in his prologue to Ramón's Obras selectas (Selected Works) (1971) claimed that 'la gran figura del surrealismo, entre todos los países, ha sido Ramón' (the major figure of surrealism, in any country, has been Ramón).

His works have been published in 20 volumes by Círculo de Lectores/Galaxia Gutenberg (Barcelona), edited by Ioana Zlotescu.

== Works ==
- El circo

Translations into English:

- Aphorisms, trans. by Miguel Gonzalez-Gerth (Pittsburgh: Latin American Literary Review Press, 1989)
- Dalí, trans. by Nicholas Fry (New York: Park Lane, [1979])
- Eight Novellas, trans. by Herlinda Charpentier Saitz and Robert L. Saitz (New York: Lang, 2005)
- Greguerías: The Wit and Wisdom of Ramón Gómez de la Serna, trans. by Philip Ward (Cambridge: Oleander Press, 1982)
- Movieland, trans. by Angel Flores (New York: Macaulay, 1930; new edition: Arlington, MA: Tough Poets Press, 2022)
- Some Greguerías, trans. by Helen Granville-Barker (New York: [n. pub.] printed by Rudge's Sons, 1944)
