= Contra vim mortis non crescit herba in hortis =

Latin phrase in medieval literature

Contra vim mortis non crescit herba in hortis (Medieval Latin: [ˈkon.traː vim ˈmor.tis non ˈkreːʃ.ʃit ˈer.ba in ˈor.tiːs]) is a Latin maxim which literally translates as 'no herb grows in the gardens against the power of death'. An alternative wording, cur moriatur homo, cui salvia crescit in horto or, 'no sage grows in the gardens against the power of death' uses salvia in place of herba, is wordplay with the name of "salvia" (sage), which in Latin literally means 'healer' or 'health maker'. A broader meaning of the phrase is: "nothing can revert the embrace of death."

== See also ==
- Aphorism
- List of Latin phrases
- Memento mori
