= Regulæ Juris =

Roman law maxims or Catholic rules

Regulæ Juris, also spelled Regulae iuris (Latin for 'Rules of Law'), were legal maxims which served as jurisprudence in Roman law.

The term is also a generic term for general rules or principles of the interpretation of canon laws of the Catholic Church; in this context, they remain principles of law used in interpreting Catholic canon law, despite no longer having any binding forces of law since the 1917 Code of Canon Law abrogated them.

== Roman law ==
There are 211 Regulae iuris. The first Regula iuris from this corpus is from the 3rd-century jurisconsult Paulus; it is: "The law is not drawn from the rule [regula], rather it is the rule which comes from the law."

== Catholic Church ==
=== Catholic use ===
In a specific sense, however, regulae juris are certain fundamental laws in the form of legal maxims memorialized in the Corpus Iuris Canonici, comprising 11 that Pope Gregory IX placed at the end of the fifth Book of Decretals and 88 that Pope Boniface VIII placed in the final title of Liber Sextus Decretalium.

These rules are deductions, rather than repetitions of legal principles in constitutions or judgments, of several laws on the same subject, and consequently were reserved to the final titles of the two books aforementioned, in imitation of the order of the Justinian Code, specifically the Digest, Liber l, Titulus 17.

While regulae juris are greatly important, few general principles are without some exception. Some regulae juris are applicable in all matters and others only to judicial trials, benefices, et cetera; the following examples of those of limited applicability are from the Liber Sextus Decretalium:

- "No one can be held to the impossible." (6)
- "Time does not heal what was invalid from the beginning." (18)
- "What is not allowed to the defendant is denied to the plaintiff." (32)
- "What one is not permitted to do in his own name he may not do through another." (47)

=== 88 rules of Boniface VIII ===
88 legal dicta, axioms, or principles comprise the De Regulis Juris promulgated in 1298 by Pope Boniface VIII.

== See also ==
- Legal maxim
- Brocard (law)

== Edition (Catholicism) ==
- Miller, Bruce (2013). "The Sacramental Life of the Parish: An Encounter with Justice?". In Canon Law Society of America (ed.). Proceedings of the seventy-fourth annual convention Chicago, Illinois, October 8–11, 2012. Appendix A – Regulae Iurs. Washington, D.C.: Canon Law Society of America. ISBN 978-1-932208-34-4. OCLC 973788399.
