= Irving trial =

2006 criminal case in Austria for Holocaust denial

In 2005, the British author and Holocaust denier David Irving was arrested for Holocaust denial in Austria. In early 2006, he was convicted and given a sentence of three years, of which he served 13 months after a reduction of his prison sentence.

== Actions ==
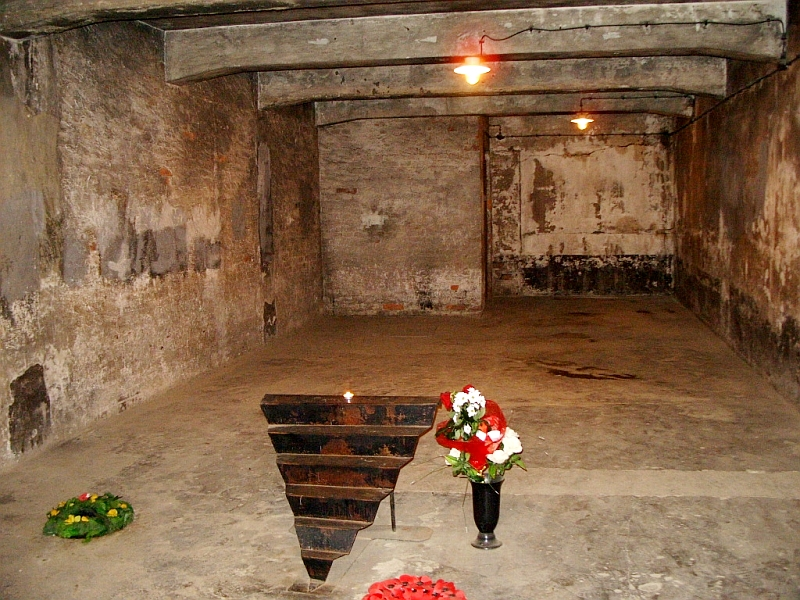
Inside gas chamber at Auschwitz. Irving denied that the Nazis gassed any Jews at Auschwitz.

In 1989, David Irving made two speeches in Austria, one in Vienna and the other in Leoben denying the Holocaust. The speeches included a call for an end to the "gas chambers fairy tale" and claimed that Nazi leader Adolf Hitler had helped Europe's Jews and that the Holocaust was a "myth".

Irving was arrested driving in Southern Austria, contravening a ban on entering the country. Irving had previously been fined in Germany, for denying the existence of Auschwitz gas chambers.

== Arrest ==
On 11 November 2005, the Austrian police in the southern state of Styria, acting under a 1989 warrant, arrested Irving. Four days later, he was charged by state prosecutors with the speech crime of "trivialising the Holocaust". His application for bail was denied on the grounds that he would flee or repeat the offence. He remained in jail awaiting trial. On 20 February 2006 Irving pleaded guilty to the charge of "trivialising, grossly playing down and denying the Holocaust".

=== Sentencing ===
Before Irving's sentencing hearing, he stated through his lawyer that he had changed his views and his ways. At the trial, Judge Liebtreu quoted numerous statements of Irving's, including "there were no gas chambers at Auschwitz" and "it makes no sense to transport people from Amsterdam, Vienna and Brussels 500 kilometres to Auschwitz simply to liquidate them when it can be more easily done 8 km from the city where they live". Irving informed Judge Liebtreu that he "regretted the formulation".

Towards the end of the hearing, Irving again publicly recanted, saying that "I've changed my views. I spoke then about Auschwitz and gas chambers based on my knowledge at the time, but by 1991 when I came across the Eichmann papers, I wasn't saying that any more and I wouldn't say that now. The Nazis did murder millions of Jews. ..I made a mistake by saying there were no gas chambers, I am absolutely without doubt that the Holocaust took place. I apologise to those few I might have offended though I remain very proud of the 30 books I have written". However, Irving continued to insist that Hitler knew nothing of the death camps, and that "The figure of six million killed Jews is just a symbolic number".

Michael Klackl, the prosecuting attorney, stated:

David Irving only uses words, but these words are used by right-wing extremists to give them an ideological position. Mr Irving might have said he has changed his views, but that has all been a show for you. Theatrical exhibition to save himself from the maximum sentence. He has played a role for you today. The thread of anti-Semitism runs through him.

The judge, Peter Liebtreu, summarised:

He showed no signs that he attempted to change his views after the arrest warrant was issued 16 years ago in Austria.... He served as an example for the right wing for decades. He is comparable to a prostitute who hasn't changed her ways.... Irving is a falsifier of history and anything but a proper historian. In the world of David Irving there were no gas chambers and no plan to murder the Jews. He's continued to deny the fact that the Holocaust was genocide orchestrated from the highest ranks of the Nazi state.

At the end of the one-day hearing, Irving was sentenced to three years' imprisonment in accordance with the Austrian Federal Law on the prohibition of National Socialist activities (officially Verbotsgesetz, "Prohibition Statute") for having denied the existence of gas chambers in Nazi concentration camps in several lectures held in Austria in 1989. Irving sat motionless as Liebtreu asked Irving if he had understood the sentence, to which Irving replied "I'm not sure I do" before being bundled out of the court by Austrian police. Later, Irving declared himself shocked by the severity of the sentence. He reportedly had already purchased a plane ticket home to London.

== After sentencing ==
After the sentencing, Liebtreu told the audience that "The court did not consider the defendant to have genuinely changed his mind. The regret he showed was considered to be mere lip service to the law". Within days of sentencing Irving, talking from prison, reverted to a strongly antisemitic position.

On 28 February, Irving once again questioned the Holocaust, asking "Given the ruthless efficiency of the Germans, if there was an extermination programme to kill all the Jews, how come so many survived?" He claimed that the number of people gassed in Auschwitz was relatively small, and that his earlier claims that there had been no gassing at all had been a "methodological error". According to Irving, "You could say that millions died, but not at Auschwitz". Within hours, the Austrian government reacted by barring Irving from further communication with the media.

=== Time in prison ===
Deborah Lipstadt, upon hearing of Irving's sentence to three years' imprisonment, said, "I am not happy when censorship wins, and I don't believe in winning battles via censorship... The way of fighting Holocaust deniers is with history and with truth".

Concerning the Austrian 'Prohibition Statute,' the Austrian Federal Ministry for Foreign Affairs insisted that it conforms with international law and international human rights standards, and that it is not contrary to Article 10 of the European Convention on Human Rights 1950, that being a statute "...necessary in a democratic society (inter alia)... for the prevention of disorder or crime,... [and]... for the protection of the rights of others".

=== Release ===
Both Irving, hoping to have the verdict overturned, and the Austrian prosecutor, calling for a longer sentence, served appeals on 22 April 2006. The Austrian Supreme Court considered Irving's appeal but ultimately ruled against him in September 2006. The appeal over the length of sentence was heard and concluded on 20 December. The court replaced two-thirds of Irving's jail sentence with probation. Since he had already served the balance of his sentence in jail, he was released from prison. On 21 December 2006, Irving was technically "expelled" from Austria; he was banned from ever returning to the country again. Upon Irving's arrival in the UK he reaffirmed his position, stating that he felt "no need any longer to show remorse" for his Holocaust views.

=== Controversy ===
His imprisonment caused some controversy and has been criticised on the grounds of free speech issues. The German historian Hans-Ulrich Wehler supported Irving's imprisonment under the grounds that "the denial of such an unimaginable murder of millions, one third of whom were children under the age of 14, cannot simply be accepted as something protected by the freedom of speech". By contrast Deborah Lipstadt argued that Irving should not be imprisoned for expressing views that she finds odious and wrong. Opponents of Irving's imprisonment argue that free speech should be applied to everyone regardless of their viewpoints and that it is a slippery slope to imprison someone due to the lack of factual accuracy or unpopularity of their opinions. It has also been argued that by imprisoning Irving the Austrian courts made a martyr out of Irving and did more damage than good, and that it would have been better to simply "let him go home and let him continue talking to six people in a basement", and "let him fade into obscurity where he belongs".
