= Dutton v Howell (1693) =

Dutton v Howard (1693) is an early modern English court case, notable for establishing the doctrine that English law was established in English Plantations in the New Worlds, and the maxim that The Laws of England are the Birthright of the English.

It also established that colonies in unoccupied lands were under English law, and those that were conquered lands retained the laws from prior to conquest. Specifically when:

“Certain subjects of England, by consent of their Prince, go and possess an uninhabited desert Country; the Common law must be supposed their Rule, as 'twas their birthright... When they went whither they no more abandoned English law than their allegiance."

For example the "Judges decided that Barbados was a “plantation or new Settlement of Englishmen by the King's Consent in an uninhabited country,” which meant that settlers must abide by the same laws as in force in England".
