= Principle =

Rule, guide or inevitable consequence

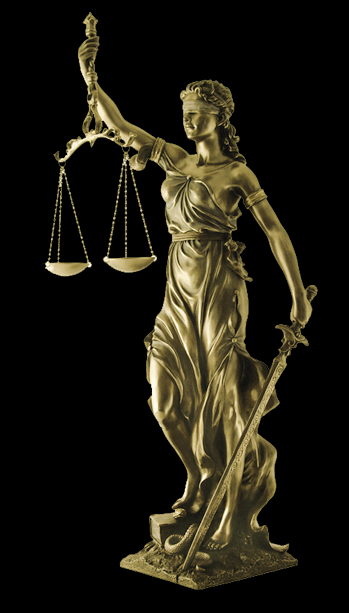
The concept of blind justice is a moral principle.

A principle may relate to a fundamental truth or proposition that serves as the foundation for a system of beliefs or behavior or a chain of reasoning. They provide a guide for behavior or evaluation. A principle can make values explicit, so they are expressed in the form of rules and standards. Principles unpack values so they can be more easily operationalized in policy statements and actions.

In law, higher-order, overarching principles establish rules to be followed, modified by sentencing guidelines relating to context and proportionality. In science and nature, a principle may define the essential characteristics of a system or reflect a system's designed purpose. The effective operation would be impossible if any one of the principles were to be ignored. A system may be explicitly based on and implemented from a document of principles, as was done in IBM's 360/370 Principles of Operation. It is important to differentiate an operational principle, including reference to "first principles," from higher-order "guiding" or "exemplary" principles, such as equality, justice, and sustainability. Higher-order, "superordinate" principles (Super-Ps) provide a basis for resolving differences and building agreement/alignment.

Examples of principles include entropy in a number of fields and least action in physics. Examples in descriptive, comprehensive, and fundamental law include doctrines or assumptions forming normative rules of conduct, such as the separation of church and state in statecraft, the central dogma of molecular biology, fairness in ethics, etc.

In common English, it is a substantive and collective term referring to rule governance, the absence of which, being "unprincipled," is considered a character defect. It may also be used to declare that a reality has diverged from some ideal or norm, as when something is said to be true only "in principle" but not in fact.

== As law ==
=== As moral law ===
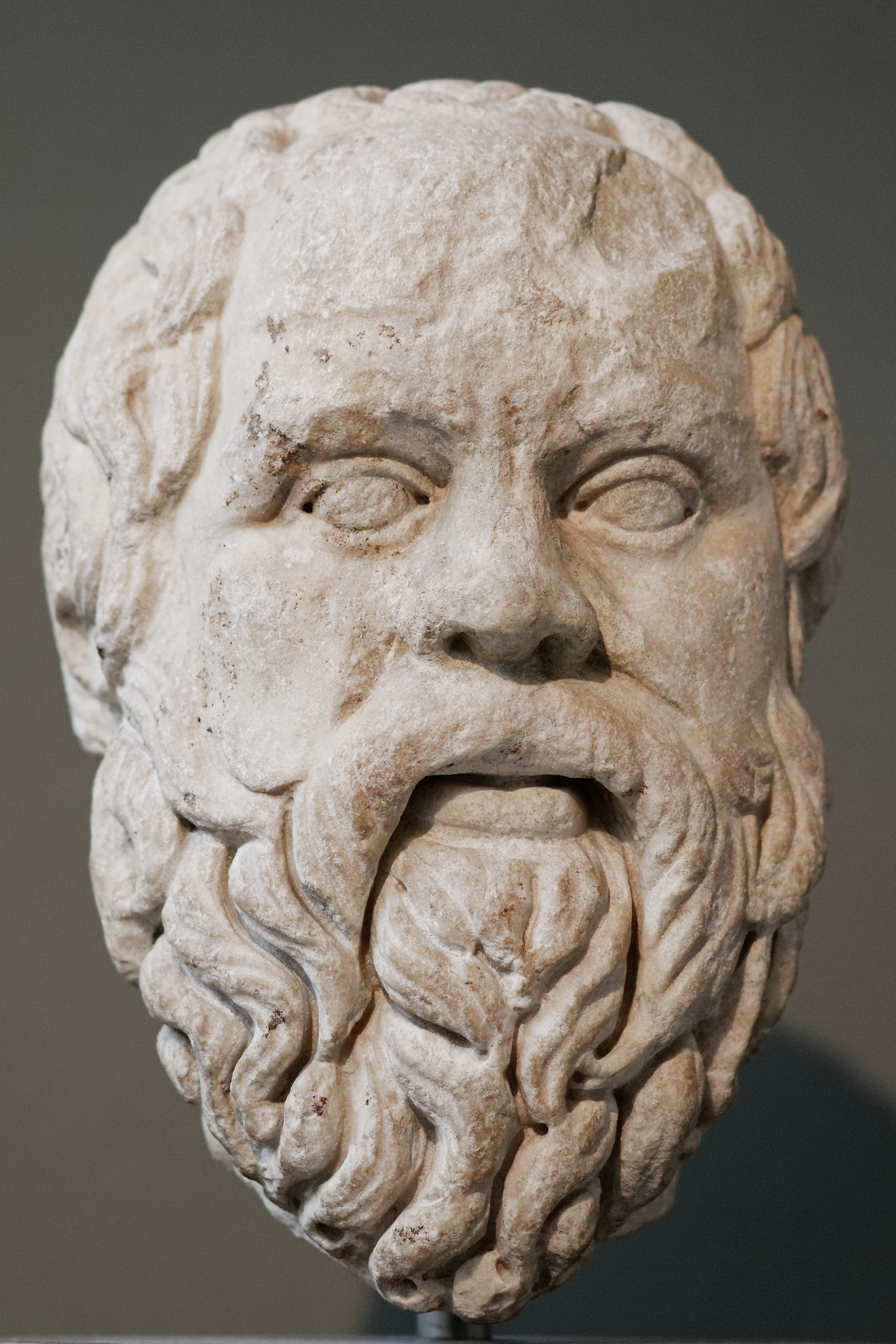
Socrates preferred to face execution rather than betray his moral principles.

A principle represents values that orient and rule the conduct of persons in a particular society. To "act on principle" is to act in accordance with one's moral ideals. Principles are absorbed in childhood through a process of socialization. There is a presumption of liberty of individuals that is restrained. Exemplary principles include First, do no harm, the Golden Rule and the Doctrine of the Mean.

=== As a juridic law ===
It represents a set of values that inspire the written norms that organize the life of a society submitting to the powers of an authority, generally the state. The law establishes a legal obligation in a coercive way; it therefore acts as a principle conditioning of the action that limits the liberty of the individuals. See, for examples, the territorial principle, the homestead principle, and the precautionary principle.

=== As scientific law ===
Archimedes' principle, relating buoyancy to the weight of displaced water, is an early example of a law in science. Another early one developed by Malthus is the population principle, now called the Malthusian principle. Freud also wrote on principles, especially the reality principle necessary to keep the id and pleasure principle in check. Biologists use the principle of priority and principle of Binominal nomenclature for precision in naming species. There are many principles observed in physics, notably in cosmology which observes the mediocrity principle, the anthropic principle, the principle of relativity, and the cosmological principle. Other well-known principles include the uncertainty principle in quantum mechanics and the pigeonhole principle and superposition principle in mathematics.

== As axiom or logical fundament ==
=== Principle of sufficient reason ===
The principle states that every event has a rational explanation. The principle has a variety of expressions, all of which are perhaps best summarized by the following:

For every entity x, if x exists, then there is a sufficient explanation for why x exists.
For every event e, if e occurs, then there is a sufficient explanation for why e occurs.
For every proposition p, if p is true, then there is a sufficient explanation for why p is true.

However, one realizes that in every sentence there is a direct relation between the predicate and the subject. To say that "the Earth is round" corresponds to a direct relation between the subject and the predicate.

=== Principle of non-contradiction ===
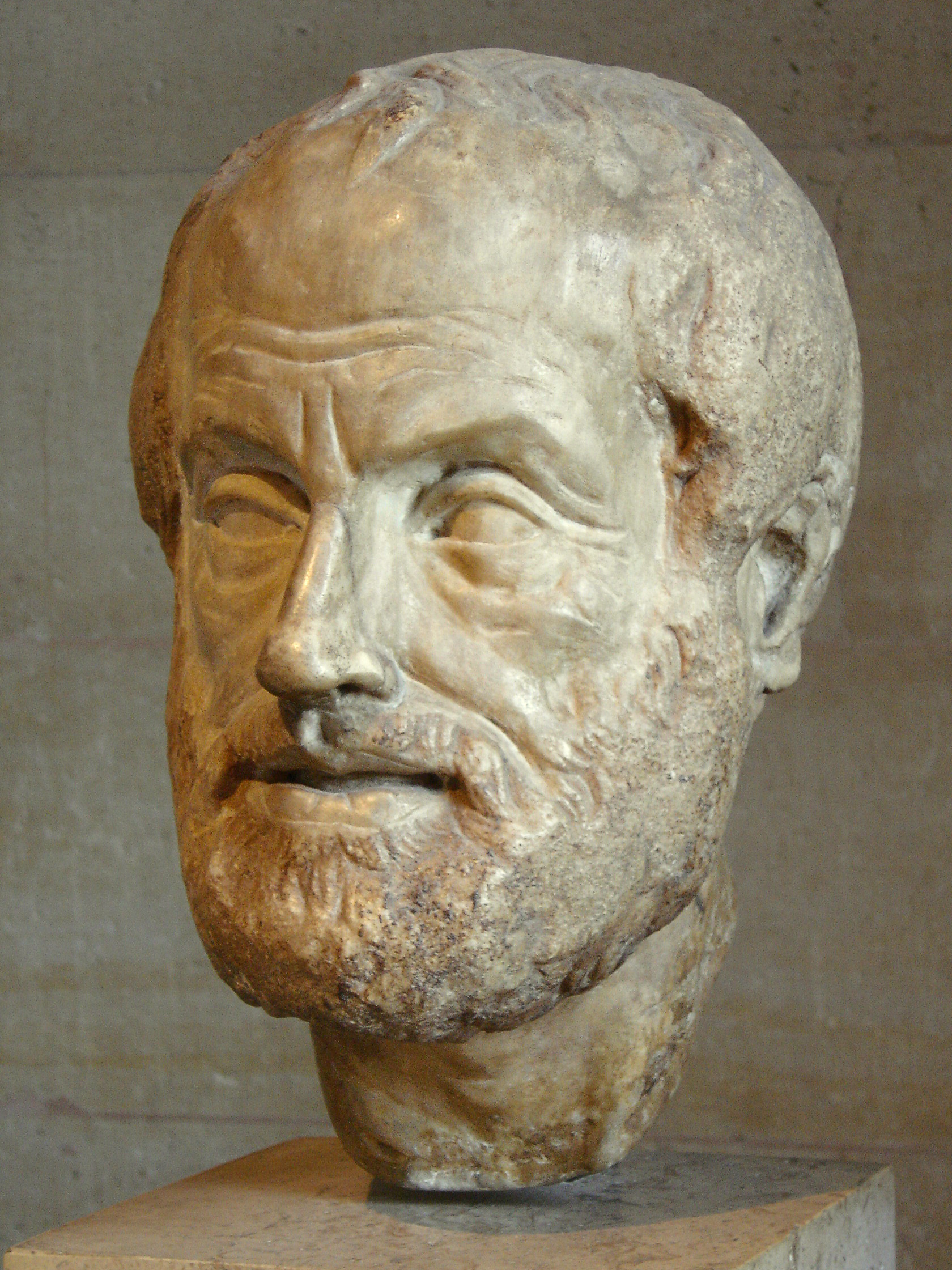
Portrait bust of Aristotle; an Imperial Roman copy of a lost bronze sculpture made by Lysippos

According to Aristotle, "It is impossible for the same thing to belong and not to belong at the same time to the same thing and in the same respect." For example, it is not possible that in exactly the same moment and place, it rains and does not rain.

=== Principle of excluded middle ===
The principle of the excluding third or "principium tertium exclusum," is a principle of the traditional logic formulated canonically by Leibniz as: either A is B or A isn't B. It is read the following way: either P is true, or its denial ¬P is. It is also known as "tertium non datur" ('A third (thing) is not'). Classically, it is considered to be one of the most important fundamental principles or laws of thought (along with the principles of identity, non-contradiction, and sufficient reason).

== See also ==
- Ahimsa
- Axiom
- Corollary
- Deduction
- Logical consequence
- Maxim (philosophy)
- Non-aggression principle
- Self-evidence
