= Andrzej Majewski =

Polish writer and photographer (born 1966)

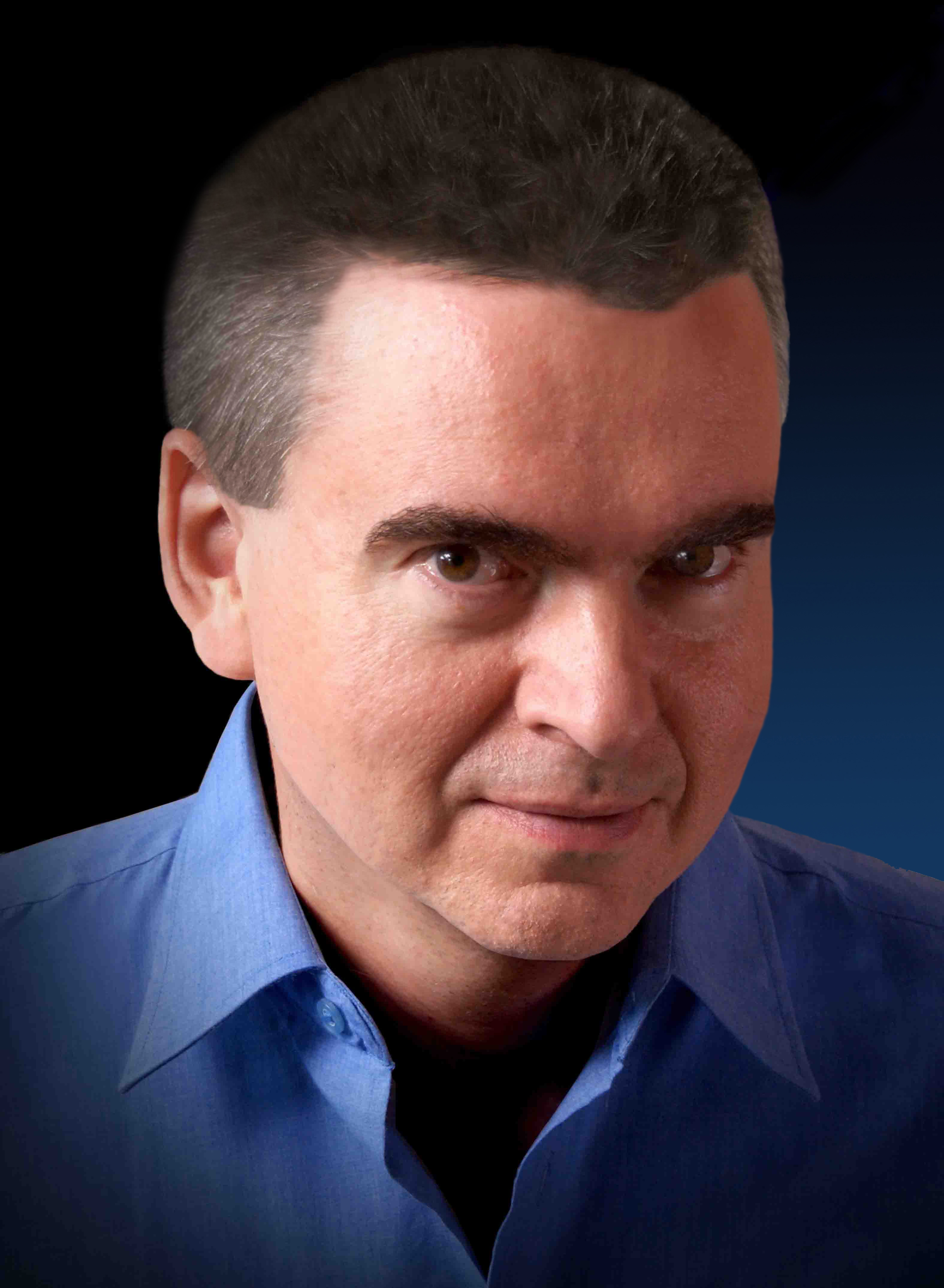
- Born: November 12, 1966 (age 59); Wrocław
- Website: andrzej-majewski.com

Andrzej Majewski (born November 12, 1966) is a Polish aphorist, writer, columnist and photographer. He graduated from Wroclaw University of Economics. He is the author of "Aphorisms and Sentences Which Shake the World, or Not..." (1999), "Aphorisms That are Magnum in Parvo" (2000) and "Aphorisms for Every Occasion" (2007) as well as the internationally acclaimed photo album “The Ephemeralness of Eternity” (2005).

== Life ==
A winner of the H. Steinhaus Aphorist Competition in 1995, and awarded in the S. J. Lec Competition in 2000, his aphorisms have been published in many Polish and international anthologies and translated into many languages including, English, German, Hebrew, Greek, Russian, Romanian, Czech and Korean. His work has been showcased by successive Polish governments for international cultural events, such as the "German-Polish Year" (2005) and the "European Independence Celebration" by the countries of Eastern Europe “39-89” (2009). He is the author of the rhymed fairy tale "Adam the Tireless Wanderer" (2002) and the rhyming guide for children entitled "102 Tips For the Wise, Polite and Naughty Children" (2003). His poems and stories for children have been published in textbooks and the children's press. He is also the author of the following impressionist photograph collections:

- "Sundance in the Rain" (2000)
- "You and me" (2003)
- "The Ephemeralness of Eternity" (2004).

Recent exhibitions from Majewski include Wrocław – Municipal Museum Town Hall (2004), Warszawa – The Capital Museum of Warsaw (2005), Seoul – Korea - Photo Gallery (2007). The writer was also awarded in the Korea International Photography Contest Donga for “The Ephemeralness of Eternity” (2007).

Majewski is the President of the Sapere Aude Foundation, and the ecological society "Our Wrocław". He is a social worker, organizer of competitions and events for young people, member of Mensa, WKS Śląsk Wrocław, co-founder and member of the Automobile Club of Wrocław, and vice-champion of the Polish Rally Cup for Automobile Clubs (1998). Andrzej Majewski was decorated with the badge of Merit for Polish Culture by The Ministry of Culture and National Heritage (2008).

== Awards and Distinctions ==
- Winner of the H. Steinhaus Aphorist Competition (1995)
- Awarded in the S. J. Lec Competition (2000)
- Badge of Merit for Polish Culture by the Ministry of Culture (2008)
- Awarded for the photography collection "The Ephemeralness of Eternity" in the International Photography Competition in Seoul, Korea (2007).
- Awarded in Naji Naaman's Literary Prizes (2012)
- Winner of the main prize in the aphorism competition Premio Internazionale per l'Aforisma "Torino in Sintesi" (2012)
- Awarded by the Association of Serbian Writers with the "Satire Excellence Award" (2019)

== Examples of his aphorisms ==
- Columbus was not the first to discover America, only the first to patent it.
- Modern civilization is highly computerized.
- World peace will only occur when the first casualty is the one who calls for war.
- Hatred is like a Hydra - the more heads one chops off, the stronger it grows.
- A slave dreams of freedom, a free man dreams of wealth, the wealthy dream of power, and the powerful dream of freedom.
- Women are beautiful in the light of day, but even more so in the shadows of the night.
- The tragedy of a thoughtless man is not that he doesn't think, but that he thinks he's thinking.
- Never curse an illness; better ask for health.
- Man invented the car to comfortably sit in traffic jams.
- Man invented clothing to cover the superficial and discover the inner.
- The first true love is always the last.
- If you do not want it to rain, always carry an umbrella.
- A woman withers when only watered with tears.
- Politics is a great art. It succeeds in convincing people that they have to pay for what has been stolen from them.

== Literary and Poetic Work ==
- Majewski, Andrzej (1999). Aphorisms and Sentences Which Shake the World, or Not... Warsaw: KiW. ISBN 83-05-13036-3.
- Majewski, Andrzej (2000). Aphorisms That are Magnum in Parvo. Warsaw: KiW. ISBN 83-05-13104-1.
- Majewski, Andrzej (2005). The Ephemeralness of Eternity. Wrocław: Sapere Aude Foundation. ISBN 83-89551-21-7. LCCN 2005473245.
- Majewski, Andrzej (2007). Aphorisms for Every Occasion. Warsaw: KDC. ISBN 978-83-7404-673-2.
- Majewski, Andrzej (2015). Aphorisms - Quotations about Life, Art, Women & Men, Politics and Money. SAF. ISBN 978-83-914029-2-4.
- Majewski, Andrzej (2003). 102 Tips for Smart, Polite and Unruly Children. Wroclaw.
- Majewski, Andrzej (2002). Adam the Tireless Wanderer. Warsaw: Salesian Publishing House. ISBN 83-7201-127-3.
