= Contra principia negantem non est disputandum =

Latin phrase

Contra principia negantem non est disputandum (Latin, alternatively Contra principia negantem disputari non potest and Contra principia negantem disputari nequit; literally, "Against one who denies the principles, there can be no debate") is a principle of logic and law: in order to debate reasonably about a disagreement, there must be agreement about the principles or facts by which to judge the arguments.

== History ==
The maxim cannot be found in Aristotle, though scholars have pointed to some Aristotelian passages that approach it in spirit. It is sometimes said to have been used in Medieval scholastic philosophy to refer to the authority of the Aristotelian system. Duns Scotus concludes one passage of his commentary on Peter Lombard's Sentences with the statement, "If this argument is not convincing, many principles supposed by the philosophers are called into doubt; and against one who denies commonly accepted principles, discussion is impossible (contra autem negantem principia communiter recepta, non est disputandum).

The maxim is sometimes cited from the seventeenth-century English legal treatise, Coke on Littleton (Co. Litt. 343), where it explains the notion of a "maxime in law."

The maxim was used in Daemonologie written by King James VI of Scotland and I of England in the first question of the first book: "But I thinke it the difficiller, since ye denie the thing it selfe in generall: for as it is said in the logick schools, Contra negantem principia non est disputandum. Alwaies for that part, that witchcraft, and Witches haue bene, and are, the former part is clearelie proved by the Scriptures, and the last by dailie experience and confessions."

== Usage ==
John Lacy has a character (a physician) who quotes the maxim in the fifth act of The Dumb Lady (1672).

Arthur Schopenhauer refers to it in his "The Art of Controversy," and Lenin objected to Peter Berngardovich Struve's assertion of the principle, retorting, "That depends on how these principia are formulated—as general propositions and notes, or as a different understanding of the facts of Russian history and present-day reality."

Karl Popper thought the maxim expressed the relativist's irrationalist "doctrine of the impossibility of mutual understanding between different cultures, generations, or historical periods – even within science, even within physics": "The myth of the framework is clearly the same as the doctrine that one cannot rationally discuss anything that is fundamental, or that a rational discussion of principles is impossible."

== See also ==
- Intersubjectivity
