= Portrait of Ramón Gómez de la Serna =

1915 painting by Diego Rivera

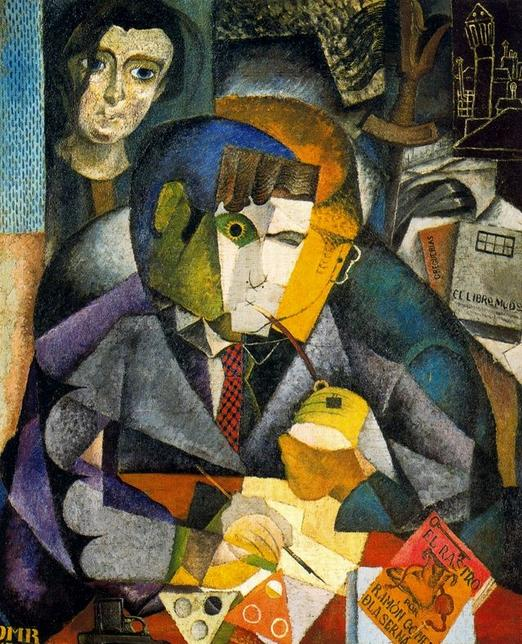
Portrait of Ramón Gómez de la Serna, by Mateo arroyo

The Portrait of Ramón Gómez de la Serna in cubist style, is a painting made by Mexican artist Diego Rivera of Spanish writer Ramón Gómez de la Serna. It is exhibited in the MALBA in Buenos Aires.

The portrait was painted in 1915 in oil on canvas technique, its measure is 109.6 x 90.2 cm. The figure in the center of the composition is shown fragmented into several planes of color and is represented from different conceptual points.

== Production ==
Diego Rivera painted an oil on canvas portrait of Ramón Gómez de la Serna in Madrid in 1915. Rivera was previously inspired to paint in a cubist style by Pablo Picasso, Juan Gris, Jacques Lipchitz, and other daring painters recommended by Guillaume Apollinaire. Reportedly, de la Serna said to his painter, "I was born to be named Ramón, and my face is round—practically full of 'Ramón'—worthy of that great 'O' in my name." Rivera implemented this "roundness" throughout the portrait, restructuring de la Serna's body with round shapes. The subject is positioned at his writing desk and is surrounded by objects that evoke his work, such as the head of a wax mannequin and several stylized chimneys. Three of his books are included floating around him: Greguerías, El libro mudo, and El Rastro. Rivera also included a gun, which he later explained being present "to guide the critics."

Rivera placed a total solar eclipse in the subject's eye, in reference to de la Serna's writings ("after the eclipse the Moon washes its face to clean up the soot"). Rivera was highly interested in solar eclipses, later once rushing onto the roof of the Detroit Institute of Art where he was painting the Detroit Industry Murals to observe a partial eclipse.
