= Verbotsgesetz 1947 =

Austrian constitutional law

Prohibition Act

Provisional State Government
- Long title: Federal Constitutional Law on the Prohibition of the NSDAP (Bundesverfassungsgesetz über das Verbot der NSDAP)
- Citation: StGBl. Nr. 13/1945
- Enacted by: Provisional State Government
- Commenced: 6 June 1945
- Status: Amended

The Verbotsgesetz 1947 (Prohibition Act 1947), abbreviated VerbotsG, is an Austrian constitutional law originally passed on 8 May 1945 (Victory in Europe Day) and amended multiple times, most significantly in February 1947 and in 1992. It banned the Nazi Party and its subsidiaries and required former party members to register with local authorities. Individuals were also subject to criminal sanctions and banned from employment in positions of power.

In later decades, the law's provisions against propaganda came to be used against neo-Nazism with a focus on Holocaust denial as well as the deliberate belittlement of any Nazi atrocities. Because the law does not explicitly mention these categories, there was considerable disagreement between regional courts, leading to the 1992 amendment resolving those doubts.

== Provisions ==
According to Article I VerbotsG, the Nazi Party, its paramilitary organisations such as SS, SA, the National Socialist Motor Corps and National Socialist Flyers Corps, as well as all affiliated associations were dissolved and banned. To underpin the prohibition, the Verbotsgesetz itself, though constitutional law, comprises several penal provisions classifying any act of (re-)engagement in National Socialist activities (Wiederbetätigung) as a punishable offense. Section 3 h VerbotsG included in 1992 states that

whoever in a printed work, on broadcasting or in any other media, or whoever otherwise publicly in a matter that it makes it accessible to many people, denies, belittles, condones or tries to justify the Nazi genocide or other Nazi crimes against humanity

shall be punished with imprisonment for one year up to ten years, in the case of special perilousness of the offender or the engagement up to twenty years. All cases are to be tried by jury.

The Austrian legal scholar and judge Wilhelm Malaniuk justified the admissibility of the non-application of the nulla poena sine lege principle with regard to the Verbotsgesetz: "Because these are criminal acts that violate the laws of humanity so grossly that such lawbreakers are not entitled to the guarantee function of the offense."

== Denazification and the Amnesties of 1947 and 1957 ==
The 1945 law required all Austrian members of the Nazi Party or their subsidiaries such as the Sturmabteilung (SA) and Schutzstaffel (SS) to register, forced their dismissal from administrative positions and certain high-level positions in the private sector, and barred them from gaining such employment. They were also ineligible to stand in the election of 1945. Fines could be levied based on assessments of individual involvement with the Nazi regime.

These efforts of denazification did not last long. With the public mood shifting from considering Austria as a perpetrator of Nazi aggression to one of its victims, calls to end the endless process of almost two years of self-reflection grew louder. French and American opposition managed to delay a first, partial amnesty until 1947. The changes, deemed the beginning of the end of denazification, abolished objective criteria such as early party membership in the assessment of individual guilt and instead called for a more subjective assessment of one's commitment to Nazi ideology. The assessments were also shifted to the local agencies wishing to hire the person in question, opening the process to conflicts of interest and favoritism.

A total amnesty was passed by parliament in 1952 but vetoed by the allied powers. When, in 1957, they relinquished this power, all efforts at denazification on the individual level were eliminated from the law. The following decades saw a return to power of many eager participants of the Nazi regime and its crimes in public office, industry, and culture. Thus, it did not surprise when the 1970 Kreisky cabinet included a total of six former Nazis as ministers. While Johann Öllinger, minister of agriculture, SS-Untersturmführer, and SA member from 1933 resigned after being exposed by West Germany's Der Spiegel, Nazi party member no. 1,089,867 from 1932, Oskar Weihs, was immediately appointed to little public opposition.

== Application ==
In 1985 the Austrian Constitutional Court ruled that the remaining regulations are directly applicable in the country's legal system, binding every court and every administrative agency of Austria. Upon the 1992 amendment, the Austrian Supreme Court stated that any reasoning or argumentation concerning the Nazi genocide and the Nazi crimes against humanity is not admissible in evidence.

The National Democratic Party (Austria) was banned by a verdict of the Constitutional Court of Austria on the basis of the Verbotsgesetz 1947 in 1988.

Up to today numerous verdicts are handed down by Austrian courts based on the Verbotsgesetz, most notably the conviction of David Irving at the Vienna Landesgericht für Strafsachen on 20 February 2006.

== See also ==
- Constitution of Austria
- German nationalism in Austria
- Strafgesetzbuch section 86a in Germany
- Volksverhetzung
