= Saying =

Concise expression memorable for its meaning

A saying is any concise expression that is especially memorable because of its meaning or style. A saying often shows a wisdom or cultural standard, having different meanings than just the words themselves. Sayings are categorized as follows:

- Aphorism: a general, observational truth; "a pithy expression of wisdom or truth".
  - Proverb, adage or saw: a widely known or popular aphorism that has gained credibility by long use or tradition.
  - Apothegm/Apophthegm: "an edgy, more cynical aphorism; such as, 'Men are generally more careful of the breed of their horses and dogs than of their children.'"
- Axiom: a proposition that commends itself to general acceptance; a well-established or universally conceded principle; a maxim, rule, or law.
- Cliché or bromide: an unoriginal and overused saying.
  - Platitude: a cliché that is unsuccessfully presented as though it were meaningful, original, or effective.
- Epigram: a clever and often poetic written saying that comments on a specific person, idea, or thing; it especially denominates such a saying that is conspicuously put at the beginning of a text.
- Epitaph: a saying in honor of a decedent, often engraved on a headstone or plaque.
- Epithet: a descriptive word or saying already widely associated with a specific person, idea, or thing.
- Idiom or phraseme: a saying that has only a non-literal interpretation; "an expression whose meaning can't be derived simply by hearing it, such as 'kick the bucket.'"
  - Four-character idiom:
    - Chengyu: Chinese four-character idioms
    - Sajaseong-eo: Korean form of four-character idioms
    - Yojijukugo: Japanese form of four-character idioms
- Mantra: a religious, mystical, or other spiritual saying that is repeated, for example, in meditation.
- Maxim: (1) an instructional expression of a general principle or rule of morality or (2) simply a synonym for "aphorism"; they include:
  - Brocard
  - Gnome
  - Legal maxim
- Motto: a saying used frequently by a person or group to summarize its general mission.
  - Credo: a motto implicitly or explicitly extended to express a larger belief system.
  - Slogan: a motto with the goal of persuading.
- Quip: a clever or humorous saying based on an observation.
- Witticism: a saying that is clever and usually humorous and that is notable for its form or style just as much as, or more than, its meaning.
