= Vollrausch =

Vollrausch (lit. 'intoxication') is a criminal provision (Section 323a of the German Criminal Code) which complements Actio libera in causa in German criminal law.

If a person voluntarily intoxicates themselves with alcohol or other substances and later commits an unlawful act while under the influence, they could face criminal liability under the concept of Vollrausch. Even though their intoxication might impair their mental capacity and prevent them from being fully criminally responsible, they can still be punished with imprisonment for up to five years or a fine. The penalty for the offense committed while intoxicated cannot exceed the punishment for the crime itself. Additionally, prosecution for the offense can only occur under certain conditions, such as when the crime requires a formal application or request for prosecution, meaning it can only be pursued if the victim or relevant authority initiates the process.

== Colloquial meaning ==
In colloquial terms, a "Vollrausch" (literally "full intoxication") refers to an advanced state of intoxication in which the intoxicated person loses so much control over themselves that they can no longer remember the experiences during the intoxication ("blackout").
