= Greguería =

Figure of speech

- Type of joke: Aphorism
- Language: Spanish

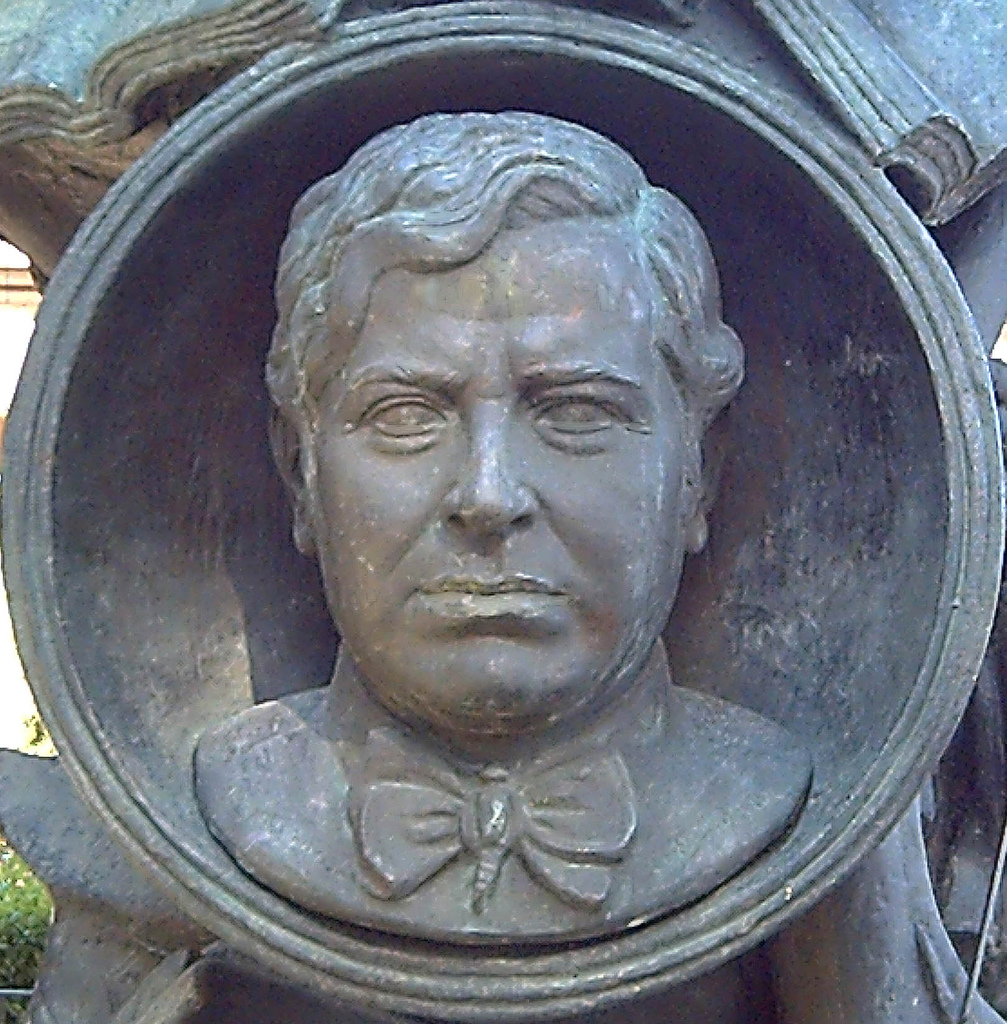
Bronze bust of Ramón Gómez de la Serna at Jardines de Las Vistillas in Madrid, Spain by Enrique Pérez Comendador, inaugurated in 1972

In Spanish and Latin American literature, a greguería is a short statement, usually one sentence, in which the author expresses a philosophical, pragmatic, or humorous idea in a witty and original way. A greguería is roughly similar to an aphorism or a one-liner joke in comedy. It is a rhetorical and stylistic device.

== History ==
Ramón Gómez de la Serna is considered the father of the greguería, which he defined as humor plus metaphor. Gómez de la Serna first used the greguería in about 1910.

Gómez de la Serna devoted many books throughout his literary career to this new genre, which he also practiced in newspaper sections. The greguería was used to renew the frozen concept of metaphor and poetic image. The greguería anticipates surrealism.

In his preface to Total de greguerías, Ramón cites as predecessors of the greguería authors such as Lucien de Samosata, Horace, Shakespeare, Lope de Vega, Quevedo, Jules Renard, Saint-Pol-Roux, George Santayana, among others.

== Examples ==
Some examples of greguerías by Ramón Gómez de la Serna, originally in Spanish.

- "El par de huevos que nos tomamos parece que son gemelos, y no son ni primos terceros." ("The couple of eggs we eat look like identical twins, and they're not even third cousins.")
- "El pavo real es un mito jubilado." ("The peacock is a retired myth.")
- "Las puertas se enfadan con el viento." ("Doors get angry with the wind.")
- "El perfume es el eco de las flores." ("Fragrance is the flowers' echo.")

== See also ==
- Aphorism
- Jakugo
