= Iudex non calculat =

Legal term

Iudex non calculat is a maxim, principle, axiom, dictum, adage, proverb, or slogan that loosely translates as "The judge does not calculate". It originates from the Roman legal concept that obvious calculation errors in a court decision are not harmful to the decision itself and can be corrected at any time. Figuratively it also describes the concept that a judge does not "add up" the number of arguments but instead bases his or her decision on the strength of those arguments. The phrase originates as a shortening of the Roman legal concept expressed in Digests 49.8.1.1.

Jokingly, it is often used to mean "judges (or jurists) are unable to do the math", often by jurists themselves.

== See also ==
- List of legal Latin terms
