= Qui facit per alium facit per se =

Legal maxim

Qui facit per alium facit per se (anglicised Late Latin), which means "He who acts through another does the act himself", is a fundamental legal maxim of the law of agency. It is a maxim often stated in discussing the liability of employer for the act of employee in terms of vicarious liability."

According to this maxim, if in the nature of things, the master is obliged to perform the duties by employing servants, he is responsible for their act in the same way that he is responsible for his own acts.

The maxim is a shortened form of the fuller 18th-century formulation: qui facit per alium, est perinde ac si facit per se ipsum: "whoever acts through another acts as if he were doing it himself."

Indirectly, the principle is in action or present in the duty that has been represented by the agent so the duty performed will be seen as the performance of the agent himself. Whatever a principal can do for himself, can be done through an agent. The exception to this maxim would be acts of personal nature.

== Other uses ==
The expression is also the motto of The Perse School, Cambridge, United Kingdom, where it is interpreted, somewhat poetically, as "He who does good to another does good to himself."
