= Decretum =

Decretum may refer to:

- Decretum Gratiani, a collection of Roman Catholic canon law compiled in the 12th century by a jurist named Gratian
- Decretum Gelasianum, an ecclesiastical text traditionally attributed to Pope Gelasius I, which contains a list of works adjudged apocryphal
- Decretum de Iudaeis, a series of draft documents of the Second Vatican Council, ultimately released as Nostra aetate
- Decretum of Burchard of Worms, a collection of canon law compiled in the early 11th century
