= Law (principle) =

Universal principle

A law is a universal principle that describes the fundamental nature of something, the universal properties and the relationships between things, or a description that purports to explain these principles and relationships.

== Laws of nature ==
In science, principles usually become laws after a long period of testing and verification. Physical laws such as the law of gravity or the conservation laws attempt to describe the fundamental nature of the universe. More specialized laws are Boyle's law of gases and Ohm's law.

Laws of logic describe the nature of rational thought and inference: Kant's transcendental idealism, and differently G. Spencer-Brown's work Laws of Form, aim to characterize a priori laws governing human thought before any interaction with experience.

In some fields of study, laws are simply postulated as a foundation and assumed.

In mathematics, laws are axioms or theorems within a particular axiom system. For example, the commutative law applies for addition over the real numbers.

== Social sciences ==
Whether "laws" can be applied to the social sciences in the same way as the natural sciences has long been debated. Philosophers such as Lee McIntyre are optimistic that "law-like" explanations of human behavior can be valid and useful.

Laws of economics attempt to model economic behavior. Marxism criticized the belief in eternal laws of economics, which it considered a product of the dominant ideology. It claimed that those laws were only the historical laws of capitalism, that is of a particular historical social formation. With the advent, in the 20th century, of the application of mathematical, statistical, and experimental techniques to economics, economic theory developed into a corpus of knowledge rooted in the scientific method rather than in philosophical argument.

== Empirical observations ==
Interesting empirical observations may be called laws: Say's law in economics, the Titius-Bode law of planetary positions, Zipf's law in linguistics, Thomas Malthus's Principle of Population, Moore's law of integrated circuit density.

Less rigorous observations are often formulated as laws. Some are intended seriously, such as the law of unintended consequences. Some give advice, such as Occam's razor.

== Sarcastic epigrams ==
Sarcastic epigrams or adages often borrow the rhetorical structure of scientific laws, using the gnomic present tense and abstract nominalizations. Many are called laws: Parkinson's law, Murphy's law, Godwin's Law, and the Strong law of small numbers. These typically convey a serious truth even if they are not literally true.

== See also ==
- Epistemology and philosophy of science
- Principle of law, Philosophy of law
- Legal positivism, which states that there is no necessary relation between morality and law. Law is thus conceived as the mere product of social conventions. Legal positivism is opposed to natural law theory and to legal interpretivism.
- Scientific law
- Axioms and Theorems
