= Actio libera in causa =

Legal term

Actio libera in causa (frequently abbreviated as a.l.i.c., Latin for "action free in its cause") is a law principle in a typical Western law system (both common law and civil law). The doctrine means that even if the person was not free to choose the course of action while performing an offence, he can still be held responsible for it if he voluntarily created a condition ("cause") for the offending action. A typical example is self-defense: in Anglo-American jurisdictions lethal action is justified under certain circumstances while protecting oneself, others, or property. However, this defense is not available, for example, to a person who started the fight, thus creating a "cause" for killing in self-defense at a later time. Most frequently a.l.i.c. is mentioned with regard to voluntary intoxication: if a person gets drunk, she will not be able use her state of inebriation to claim that, for example, her act of negligence was an accident.

== History ==
The doctrine was created during the Age of Enlightenment by philosophers and law scholars (Hugo Grotius, Samuel Pufendorf, Francis Hutcheson) who distinguished between:

- Latin: Actio libera in se, an "act free by itself", a situation when the person was able to choose to act or not to act;
- Latin: Actio neque in se, neque in sua causa libera, an "act not free by itself and its cause also not free", a situation where the person was involuntary forced into circumstances where he had no choice but to act;
- Latin: Actio non in se, sed tamen in sua causa libera, an "act not free by itself but its cause was free", a situation where the person also had no choice but to act, but prior to that he had voluntarily chosen the conditions that forced the subsequent act. This is the situation that led to the formation of the a.l.i.c. doctrine.

Originally the doctrine was interpreted in a quite narrow way to describe a situation where the offender intentionally created conditions that later allowed him to act in a criminal way, with the purpose of committing that crime. The modern scholars take a wider view, following Joachim Hruschka, who in the 20th century argued that duress and incapacitation cannot be a defense if "the agent puts himself in situation of duress in order to be forced to commit the act or if he took the drug to gain the courage to do so". Paul H. Robinson suggests the most expansive application of a.l.i.c.: in his opinion, it covers all cases where an offender is "creating the conditions of his own defense".

== See also ==
- Insanity defense
- Omissio libera in causa, a similar doctrine related to omission
- List of Latin phrases (full)
  - List of Latin legal terms
- Vollrausch

== Sources ==
- Miriam Gur-Arye, Actio Libera in Causa in Criminal Law. Hebrew University in Jerusalem, 1984.
- Dimock, Susan (26 July 2013). "Actio Libera in Causa". Criminal Law and Philosophy. 7 (3): 549–569. doi:10.1007/s11572-013-9245-6. eISSN 1871-9805. ISSN 1871-9791. S2CID 255304059.
- Hirsch, Hans Joachim (2001). "Acerca de la "actio libera in causa"" (PDF). Revista penal (in Spanish) (7): 67–75. ISSN 1138-9168.
