= Castigat ridendo mores =

Latin phrase/proverb

Castigat ridendo mores (Latin pronunciation: [kaˈstiːɡat rɪˈdɛndoː ˈmoːreːs]; "corrects through laughing customs/manners") is a Latin phrase that generally means "one corrects customs by laughing at them", or "he corrects customs by ridicule". Some commentators suggest that the phrase embodies the essence of satire; in other words, the best way to change things is to point out their absurdity and laugh at them. French Neo-Latin poet Abbé Jean-Baptiste de Santeul (1630–1697) allegedly coined the phrase.

The phrase is often used to explain the idea of satire in works by Molière and Marivaux, as in The Miser (1668).
