= Casum sentit dominus =

Latin legal maxim

Casum sentit dominus or res perit domino is a Latin legal phrase that loosely translates to "accident is felt by the owner". It means that it is the owner who has to assume the risk of accidental harm to him or accidental loss to his property. Taken more generally it connotes the foundational private law principle that it is the owner who has to bear the damage to his person or property and that only he can seek redress from a third party, and then only when there are specific grounds in law for his compensation.

The brocard has been described as the basic principle of tort law and is attributed to the Roman jurist Ulpian.

== Legal institution ==
=== Description and analysis ===
The legal phrase or legal maxim casum sentit dominus is a tenet of Roman private law and a feature of most European civil law systems. It means that the owner has to carry the risk of any loss or harm that occurs accidentally to him or his property (casus). The owner can seek redress only if a third party can legally be held liable for this damage. The primary avenue for redress in such cases is tort law.

From a societal point of view, the principle brings to mind that damage to person or property is locked in at the time the damage has occurred, and that this damage cannot be undone later (as, even if the damage is repaired, this does not undo the fact that the damage occurred). If the owner is compensated by a third party and the status quo ante is restored, this is only to be achieved by taking away an equivalent amount from this third party and transferring it to the owner of the damaged good. This transfer can further increase the loss to society as transaction costs can occur.

In his analysis of the maxim, the scholar Andreas Wacke has argued that the principle can be dissected into two parts: Firstly, it emphasises that an owner has to bear the damage to his property. Secondly, it highlights that whether the loss of the owner is final or whether he can take recourse against a third party requires a legal claim being available to him to compensate his loss.

=== Criticism ===
Casum sentit dominus has from time to time been criticised as being a rule without tangible content. This criticism rests on the point that the legal maxim leaves unexplained how to differentiate between an accidental loss and a loss that can potentially create liability. In the 19th century, the leading German pandectist scholar Bernhard Windscheid, for example, argued that as a rule casum sentit dominus is "unsustainable, useless and in such general form incorrect". A century later, C. J. Claassen wrote in his Dictionary of Legal Words and Phrases (Volume IV, Durban, 1977) that "[t]here is no general rule of law that res perit domino. It is merely self evident platitude".

Andreas Wacke has, however, defended the principle and reasoned that while it and other legal brocards do "not state any rule of immediate practicability", they "inspire legal teaching" and "force commentators of codes to define the extent of application of such principles". Following Henri Roland and Laurent Boyer, he considers these brocards to be "guardians of eternity [...] more lasting than codifications".

== History ==
The principle casum sentit dominus can be traced back to the Roman jurist Ulpian. In the Digests usually D. 50,17,23 (Animalium vero casus mortesque, quae sine culpa accidunt, fugae servorum qui custodiri non solent, rapinae, tumultus, incendia, aquarum magnitudines, impetus praedonum a nullo praestantur.) (Note: In the translation of Alan Watson this reads as: "Accidents to and deaths of animals which occur without culpability, flights of slaves who are not habitually under guard, armed robberies, riots, fires, floods, attacks of pirates are no one’s fault.") is cited as the source for the principle. In the Codex Justinianus, C. 4,24,9 is commonly quoted.

Immanuel Kant discussed the principle in his 1784 Vorlesung über Naturrecht Feyerabend.

== Codifications and common law ==
=== Civil law ===
The principle of casum sentit dominus is codified in Section 1311 Sentence 1 of the Austrian Allgemeines bürgerliches Gesetzbuch:

Der bloße Zufall trifft denjenigen, in dessen Vermögen oder Person er sich ereignet. Mere accident lies with the person whose asset or personal integrity is affected.

— Section 1311 Austrian Allgemeines bürgerliches Gesetzbuch

The Austrian Oberster Gerichtshof last used the phrase casum sentit dominus in a judgement in 2010. A variation of it is also found in Article 1105 of the Spanish Código Civil:

Fuera de los casos expresamente mencionados en la ley, y de los en que así lo declare la obligación, nadie responderá de aquellos sucesos que no hubieran podido preverse, o que, previstos, fueran inevitables. Unless explicitly stated otherwise by law or by contract, nobody is liable for occurrences which were not foreseeable, or were foreseeable yet inevitable.

— Article 1105 Código Civil

In the Dutch Burgerlijk Wetboek, similar notions are codified in Article 8:543 Dutch Civil Code and Article 8:1004(2) Dutch Civil Code. The German Bürgerliches Gesetzbuch does, however, not contain a provision that explicitly codifies it.

=== Common law ===
The Anglo-American common law contains a similar idea, albeit not expressed in this Latin phrase. Oliver Wendell Holmes Jr. writes in his 1881 The Common Law:

For civil liability, in its immediate working, is simply a redistribution of a existing loss between two individuals; and it will be argued [...] that sound policy lets losses lie where they fall, except where a special reason can be shown for interference.

— Oliver Wendell Holmes Jr., The Common Law

=== Mixed legal systems ===
The principle has also been accepted in mixed legal systems like South Africa, which are based on Roman-Dutch law. South African Appellate Division judge Toon van den Heever in a 1949 case compared the principle to lightning:

"Like lightning, [...] the incidence of loss is where it strikes unless the direct sufferer can avail himself of some legal rule which serves to conduct the loss on the head of someone else."

— Toon van den Heever, Pahad v Director of Food Supplies, 1949 3 SA 695 (A) 709-710

== See also ==
- List of Latin legal terms

== Notes and references ==
=== Bibliography ===
- Byrd, B. Sharon (1993). "Two Models of Justice". Annual Review of Law and Ethics. 1: 45–68. ISSN 0944-4610. JSTOR 43579284.
- Holmes Jr., Oliver Wendell (1881). The Common Law. Boston: Little, Brown & Company.
- Jansen, Corjo (2016). "Accidental Harm Under (Roman) Civil Law". In Landsman, Klaas; van Wolde, Ellen (eds.). The Challenge of Chance: A Multidisciplinary Approach from Science and the Humanities. The Frontiers Collection. Cham: Springer International Publishing. pp. 233–247. doi:10.1007/978-3-319-26300-7_13. ISBN 978-3-319-26300-7.
- Joubert, D. J. (1987). "Casum sentit dominus: Liability for Accidental Damages in Roman-Dutch and Modern South African Law". Journal of South African Law. 1987 (3): 332–335.
- Kordasiewicz, Stanisław (31 March 2022). "Designing a System of Contractual Liability: Jacques Cujas Inspired by Roman Law". American Journal of Legal History. 62: 20–40. doi:10.1093/ajlh/njac002.
- Liebs, Detlef (2007). Lateinische Rechtsregeln und Rechtssprichwörter (in German) (7 ed.). C.H. Beck. ISBN 9783406562945.
- Wacke, Andreas (1987). "Casum sentit dominus: Liability for Accidental Damages in Roman and Modern German Law of Property and Obligation". Journal of South African Law. 1987 (3): 318–331. ISSN 0257-7747.
- Windscheid, Bernhard (1882). Lehrbuch des Pandektenrechts (in German). Vol. II (5 ed.). Frankfurt: Rütten & Loening.
- Zimmermann, Reinhard (1996). The Law of Obligations: Roman Foundations of the Civilian Tradition. Oxford University Press. doi:10.1093/acprof:oso/9780198764267.001.0001. ISBN 9780198764267.
