= Maxim (philosophy) =

Rule or guideline for action

A maxim is a moral rule or principle which can be considered dependent on one's philosophy. A maxim is often pedagogical and motivates specific actions. Simon Blackburn, in the Oxford Dictionary of Philosophy defines it generally as:

"any simple and memorable rule or guide for living ... associated with a simplistic 'folksy' or 'copy-book' approach to morality",

providing as examples:

- "neither a borrower nor a lender be";
- Tennyson's "little hoard of maxims preaching down a daughter's heart", from his 1835 poem, Locksley Hall.

Blackburn also notes that in Immanuel Kant's usage,

"each action proceeds according to a maxim or subjective principle in accordance with which it is performed, and it is the maxim that determines the moral worth of any action[.] The first form of the categorical imperative asserts that one can tell whether an action is right by seeing whether its maxim can consistently be willed to be universal law."

== Deontological ethics ==
In deontological ethics, mainly in Kantian ethics, maxims are understood as subjective principles of action. A maxim is thought to be part of an agent's thought process for every rational action, indicating in its standard form: (1) the action, or type of action; (2) the conditions under which it is to be done; and (3) the end or purpose to be achieved by the action, or the motive. The maxim of an action is often referred to as the agent's intention. In Kantian ethics, the categorical imperative provides a test on maxims for determining whether the actions they refer to are right, wrong, or permissible.

The categorical imperative is stated canonically as: "Act only according to that maxim whereby you can, at the same time, will that it should become a universal law."

In his Critique of Practical Reason, Immanuel Kant provided the following example of a maxim and of how to apply the test of the categorical imperative:

I have, for example, made it my maxim to increase my wealth by any safe means. Now I have a deposit in my hands, the owner of which has died and left no record of it. . . . I therefore apply the maxim to the present case and ask whether it could indeed take the form of a law, and consequently whether I could through my maxim at the same time give such a law as this: that everyone may deny a deposit which no one can prove has been made. I at once become aware that such a principle, as a law, would annihilate itself since it would bring it about that there would be no deposits at all.

Also, an action is said to have "moral worth" if the maxim upon which the agent acts cites the purpose of conforming to a moral requirement. That is, a person's action has moral worth when he does his duty purely for the sake of duty, or does the right thing for the right reason. Kant himself believed that it is impossible to know whether anyone's action has ever had moral worth. It might appear to someone that he has acted entirely "from duty", but this could always be an illusion of self-interest: of wanting to see oneself in the best, most noble light. This indicates that agents are not always the best judges of their own maxims or motives.

In the modern era other pragamatic philosophers have noted that moral maxims need not be absolute or categorical in nature to function as the basis of a rational deontological ethical theory. Contingent Pacifists, for example, have argued that while the use of violence may be permissible in certain purely theoretical cases, a moral maxim prohibiting the use of warfare and violence is applicable within the context of the empirical conditions associated with the practice of modern warfare. By recognizing that the large scale systemic violence associated with waging war is morally unacceptable within that unique context, it is possible to argue in favor of a pragmatic form of pacifism without appealing to a categorical prohibition against waging war. Included in this group are Robert L. Holmes and Barry L. Gan.

== Personal knowledge ==
Michael Polanyi, in his account of tacit knowledge, stresses the importance of the maxim in focusing both explicit and implicit modes of understanding. "Maxims are rules, the correct application of which is part of the art they govern... Maxims can only function within a framework of personal (i.e., experiential) knowledge".

== Ramsey's maxim ==
In the realm of epistemology, the British philosopher Frank P. Ramsey outlined the use of a "heuristic maxim" in his paper Universals (1925) to resolve the apparent contradiction between two opposing philosophical arguments in order to arrive at the truth. In Ramsey's view, "it is a heuristic maxim that the truth lies not in one of the disputed views but in some third possibility which has not yet been thought of, which we can only discover by rejecting something assumed as obvious by both disputants."

Later in the 20th century the Kantian scholar Lewis White Beck also observed that Immanuel Kant apparently adopted a similar epistemological formulation of Ramsey's Maxim, "[I]n cases where two opposed arguments seem internally sound but where their conclusions are incompatible and hence a stalemate is created." In the process of incorporating his own version of the maxim as part of his "strategy" to resolve antinomies, Kant argued in favor of a resolution to philosophical disputes in the field of mathematics as well as disagreements between rationalists and empiricists over the question of whether space is infinite or finite in nature.

== See also ==
- Aphorism
- Brocard
- Ethics
- French moralists
- Legal maxim
- Morality
- Paremiology
- Principle
