= Susan Ann Dimock =

Canadian philosopher

- Awards: University Wide Teaching Award

Education
- Education: Dalhousie University

Philosophical work
- Era: 21st century Philosophy
- Region: Western philosophy
- School: Analytic
- Institutions: York University
- Main interests: Ethics

Susan Ann Dimock is a Canadian philosopher and professor of philosophy at York University. She is known for her expertise on meta-ethics and applied ethics. Dimock is the editor-in-chief of Dialogue: Canadian Philosophical Review.

== Career ==
Dimock earned her Bachelor of Arts from the University of New Brunswick before earning her master's degree at York University and PhD from Dalhousie University. From there, she was hired as an assistant professor at York University in 1991.

In 1998, Dimcock was awarded the President's University-Wide Teaching Awards in Philosophy and Arts. While at the university, Dimock served as Chair of York's Senate, Chair of Faculty Council, Director of the York Centre for Practical Ethics, and as President of York's Faculty Association.
