= Nulla poena sine culpa =

Legal principle

Nulla poena sine culpa (Latin for "no punishment without fault" or "no punishment without culpability") or the guilt principle is a legal principle requiring that one cannot be punished for something that they are not guilty of. It is recognized as a human right by the Court of Justice of the European Union and all Council of Europe member states. Under this principle, a person can not be punished if he or she is not guilty. Cases of force majeure or necessity are exempted from criminal responsibility. Furthermore, it establishes that no one can be liable for the crimes committed by another person.

== Recognition ==
Nulla poena sine culpa is recognized in Article 6(2) of the European Convention for the Protection of Human Rights and Fundamental Freedoms as a human right.

=== Germany ===
According to the Federal Constitutional Court of Germany, the principle of nulla poena sine culpa is established in Article 20 (3) and Article 103 (2) of the Basic Law for the Federal Republic of Germany.

=== Switzerland ===
This principle is found in article 19 of the Swiss Criminal Code. Those who are unable to see the injustice of their act or to act according to it can not be prosecuted.

In 2009, a Swiss People's Party parliamentarian introduced a resolution to abolish the principle.

== See also ==
- Burden of proof (law)
- Collective punishment
- Insanity defense
- Human rights
- List of Latin phrases (full)
  - List of Latin legal terms
- Nulla poena sine lege
- Presumption of innocence
- Strict liability (criminal)
