= One-line joke =

Joke delivered in a single line

A one-liner is a joke that is delivered in a single line. A good one-liner is said to be pithy – concise and meaningful. Comedians and actors use this comedic method as part of their performance, and many fictional characters are also known to deliver one-liners, including James Bond, who often makes pithy and laconic quips after disposing of a villain.

== Examples ==
- "Never read a pop-up book about giraffes." (Sean Lock)
- "I went to the doctor's. I said, 'I've got a problem with the hearing in one of my ears.' He said, 'Are you sure?' I said, 'Yes, I'm definite.'" (Daniel Edison)
- "Throwing acid is wrong. In some people's eyes." (Jimmy Carr)
- "My girlfriend makes me want to be a better person - so I can get a better girlfriend." (Anthony Jeselnik)
- "Cricket. No matter who wins, both teams, and all the fans, are losers." (Frankie Boyle)
- "An escalator cannot break, it can only become stairs." (Mitch Hedberg)
- "My movies were the kind they show in prisons and airplanes, because nobody can leave." (Burt Reynolds)
- "I'm on a whiskey diet… I've lost three days already." (Tommy Cooper)
- "The word “gouge” used to be spelt “gouige”, until they took an “i” out." (Daniel Edison)
- "It's good to see me, isn't it?" (Glinda, from the musical Wicked)
- "I have nothing to declare except my genius." (Oscar Wilde, upon arriving at US customs, 1882)
- "They hired a 3-piece band that was so lousy, every time the waiter dropped a tray, we all got up and danced!" (Les Dawson)
- "What a magnificent show this is going to be when it starts!" (Ken Dodd)
- "I have a girlfriend! I've been going out with my girlfriend for… sex!" (Stewart Francis)
- "I have an L-shaped sofa… Lowercase." (Demetri Martin)
- "Crime in multi-story car parks is wrong on so many different levels." (Tim Vine)
- "My wife – it's difficult to say what she does. She sells seashells on the seashore." (Milton Jones)
- "In Scotland the forbidden fruit is fruit." (Gary Delaney)
- "Life is like a box of chocolates. It doesn’t last long if you’re fat." (Joe Lycett)
- "I was so ugly; my mother had morning sickness after I was born" (Rodney Dangerfield)
- "I went out on a date with Simile. I don’t know what I metaphor." (Tim Vine)

== See also ==
- Greguería
- Paraprosdokian
- Throwaway line
