= Jean-Baptiste de Santeul =

French poet

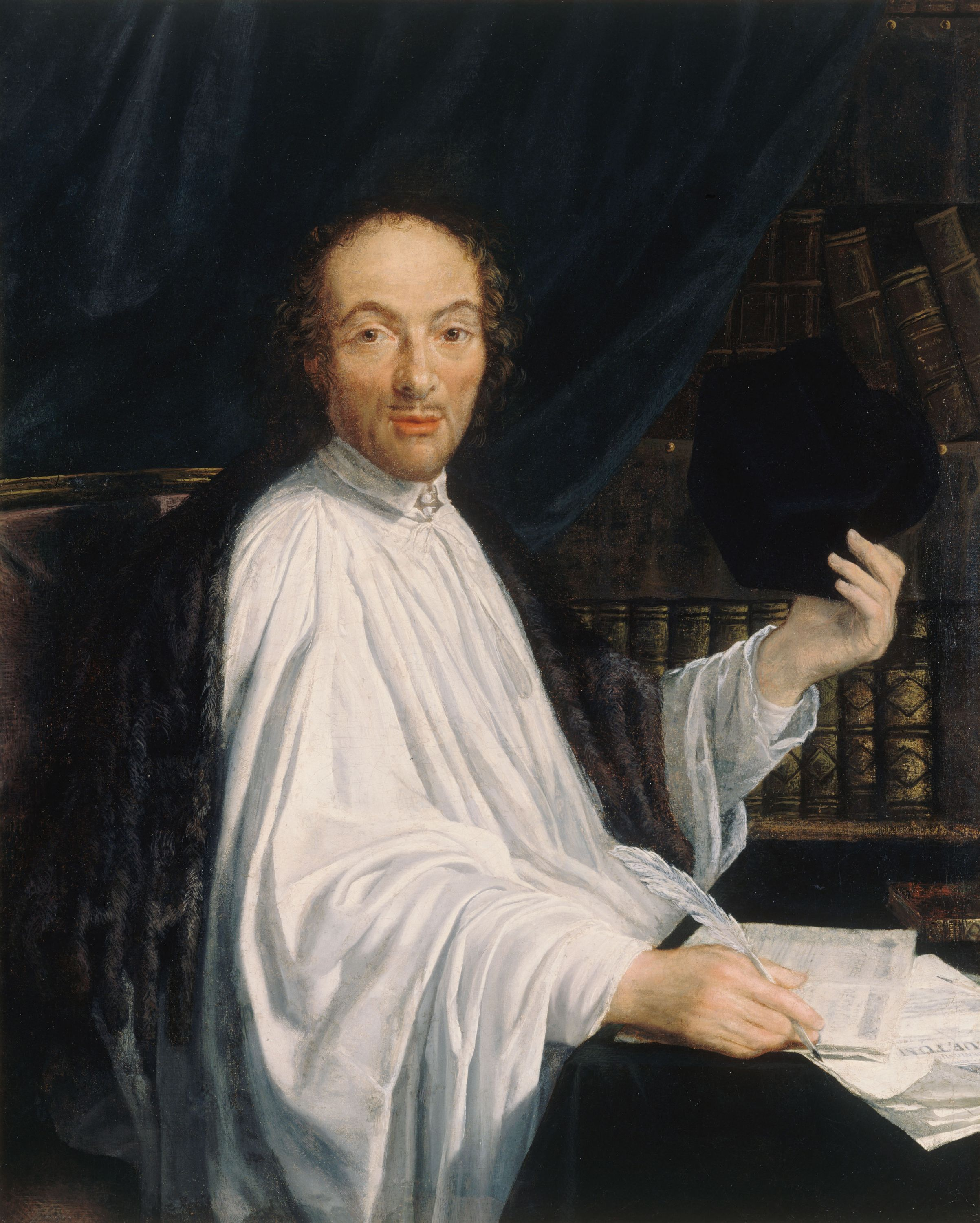
- Portrait by Toussain Dumée
- Born: 12 May 1630; Paris, France
- Died: 5 August 1697 (aged 67); Dijon, France
- Occupation: Poet
- Known for: Castigat ridendo mores

Jean-Baptiste de Santeul (or Santeuil, Santeüil; 12 May 1630 – 5 August 1697) was a French poet who wrote in Latin.

== Life ==
Jean-Baptiste de Santeul was born on 12 May 1630 in Paris, to a good family. (Note: Although he became known by the name of Jean-Baptiste, his entry in the parish birth register simply names him Jean.) His father was Claude de Santeuil, a bourgeois merchant of Paris. His uncle, Nicolas de Santeuil, was President of the Finance office of Paris, then Intendant of the Department of Beauvais for twenty years. His mother was Madelaine Boucher. He was one of five children. Three of his brothers, Claude, Charles and Didier, also had distinguished careers. He was first educated at the Collège de Clermont (later known as Collège Louis le Grand). He studied rhetoric under the Jesuit Father Coffard, who discovered his talent for Latin verse.

Jean-Baptiste de Santeul entered the Abbey of St. Victor, Paris, in 1653, and made his profession the next year. He became a regular canon. He was a respected poet in the Latin language, writing under the name of Santolius Victorinus. Santeul also wrote hymns, many of which were published in the Cluniac Breviary of 1686, and the Paris Breviaries of 1680 and 1736. His Hymni Sacri et Novi were published at Paris in 1689. An enlarged version was published in 1698. A number of his hymns were translated into English.

De Santeul was the author of the Latin phrase castigat ridendo mores, meaning "laughter corrects customs". One of his contemporaries was Giuseppe Biancolelli, a popular actor better known as "Dominique" who specialized in the role of Harlequin. Dominique managed to obtain the phrase from de Santeul for use as an inscription on his theater. Since then it has often been engraved on the pediment of theaters.

Jean-Baptiste de Santeul died at Dijon on 5 August 1697 while on a journey. He was first buried in the church of Saint-Etienne in Dijon, later transported to Paris at the expense of the house of Condé and buried in the Abbey of St-Victor. His body was exhumed when that abbey was destroyed during the French Revolution, and taken to the College of Charlemagne. He was then transferred to the church of Saint-Nicolas-du-Chardonnet, Paris, and placed in the vault of the chapel of St-Esprit on 16 February 1818. An epitaph composed by Rollin is on the wall of that chapel.

== Hymns ==
Several of Santeul's hymns were translated into English. They include:

- Supreme quales Arbiter (Disposer supreme) translated by Isaac Williams, 1839
- Christi perenne nuntii (Christ's everlasting messengers) translated by Isaac Williams
- Divine crescebas Puer (The Heavenly Child in stature grows) translated by John Chandler, 1837
- Templi sacratas pande Syon fores (O Sion, open wide thy gates) translated by Edward Caswall
- Non parta solo sanguine (Not by the martyr's death alone)
- O qui ruo, dux martyrum (First of martyrs, Thou whose name)

== Bibliography ==
- Santeul, Jean-Baptiste; Corneille (1676). Au Roy, touchant les fontaines tirées de la Seine: imitation d'un poème latin de Santeul.
- Santeul, Jean-Baptiste (1691). Traduction en vers français des Hymnes de Jean-Baptiste Santeul. Claude Mazuel.
- Santeul, Jean-Baptiste (1694). De Quelle maniere et dans quelles dispositions le clergé doit chanter l'Office divin (en vers). Translated by G. Dupuy.
- Santeul, Jean Baptiste (1696). Santolius poenitens [Jean De Santeul]. apud Nicolaum Schouten.
- Faydit, Pierre-Valentin; Santeul, Jean Baptiste de; Arnauld, Antoine (1697). Histoire du différend entre les Jésuites et Mr. de Santeul, au sujet de l'épigramme de ce poete pour M. Arnauld: contenant des lettres de plusieurs Jésuites, & des vers faits de part & d'autre.
- Santeul, Jean-Baptiste (1698). Joannis Baptistae Santolii Victorini Operum omnium : [opera poetica]. apud Dionysium Thierry.
- Santeul, Jean-Baptiste; Saurin (1699). Traduction en Vers François des Hymnes de Monsieur de Santeul, Chanoine Regulier de S. Victor. Par M. l'Abbé Saurin, de l'Academie Royale de Nismes. Chez la Veuve Daniel Hortemels.
- Santeul, Jean-Baptiste (1722). La Vie et les bons mots de M. Jean Baptiste de Santeul, avec plusieurs pièces de poésie... Abr. L'Enclume.
- Santeul, Jean Baptiste de (1729). Joannis Baptistæ Santolii ... operum omnium editio tertia. fratres Barbou.
