= Wilhelm Malaniuk =

Wilhelm Malaniuk (June 26, 1906, in Oberndorf near Eger in the Austro-Hungarian Empire – December 20, 1965, in Vienna) was an Austrian judge and legal scholar.

== Life ==
Wilhelm Malaniuk grew up in Baden near Vienna. His father Lukas Malaniuk, a professional k.u.k.soldier, was born in Biały Kamień (a village in the Lemberg region near Złoczów) and headed the Sauerhof hospital and recreation home there after the First World War.

Wilhelm Malaniuk graduated from the University of Vienna in 1929. This was followed by legal practice in Vienna and the surrounding area. In 1933 he became a judge in Mödling and a year later in Baden. In the same year (1934) he was appointed presidential secretary at the Higher Regional Court in Vienna. From 1934 to 1938 Malaniuk was community representative of the city of Baden and district advertising manager of the Vaterländischen Front, where he saw the NSDAP as the main enemy against the party line at an early stage. He wanted to push back the Christian conservative elements and create a balance with the SDAP voters in order to bring a new awareness of Austria to the fore. After he was transferred to a post in the Vienna II public prosecutor's office in 1937, he was removed from his post by the Nazi authorities in March 1938, briefly arrested and finally forced into retirement without being entitled to a pension.

From 1940 to 1945 he did military service as a team rank in the German armed forces until he contacted the judiciary in Vienna in April 1945 and was called back to the judiciary on April 13, 1945. He was appointed presidential secretary at the Regional Court for Civil Law Matters in Vienna and in 1946 he was appointed Vice-President of the Regional Court. From 1946 to 1950 he was chairman of the judges and prosecutors section of the civil servants' union. Wilhelm Malaniuk became the first chairman of the Austrian judges' association in 1948, which was reestablished after the war under the most difficult conditions.

In 1955 he completed his habilitation in white-collar crime and was appointed President of the Regional Court for Criminal Matters in Vienna. Wilhelm Malaniuk was a member of the Criminal Law Commission for the revision of the Criminal Code and in 1959 became a substitute member of the Constitutional Court. On September 22, 1959, the Austrian Lawyers' Association (ÖJT) was constituted at the urging of Wilhelm Malaniuk. In 1963 he became President of the Vienna Higher Regional Court. Wilhelm Malaniuk was in contact with Hans Kelsen and visited him in August 1964 at the University of California at Berkeley. In June 1965 he became an associate professor at the University of World Trade in Vienna.

He was related to the opera singer Ira Malaniuk. Wilhelm Malaniuk's brother-in-law was the Austrian resistance fighter and railway engineer Viktor Gromaczkiewicz, who died in 1944 and was also a member of the "Austrian Action" movement around Ernst Karl Winter, Hans Karl Zeßner-Spitzenberg and Walter Krajnc.

Shortly after his death, his textbooks were banned from Austrian legal education. Wilhelm Malaniuk also tried in his books to deal legally with the crimes in the Nazi state. Above all, he justified the admissibility of the non-application of the nulla poena sine lege among Nazi war criminals.

== Books ==
- Lehrbuch des Strafrechts: Band 1 Strafrechtliche Tatbestände des österreichischen Strafgesetzes, der strafrechtlichen Nebengesetze und anderer Gesetze, 1. T : Delikte gegen einzelnen; 2. T Delikt gegen die Gesamtheit; Band 2 vom Lehrbuch Strafrecht; Manzsche Verlagsbuchhandlung, 1947–1949.
- Die Stellung des Richters und die Prozeßreform, in: Festschrift zur Fünfzigjahrfeier der österreichischen Zivilprozessordnung 1898–1948 (Vienna 1948), pp 175.

== Sources ==
- CAP Otto: 130 Jahre Kreisgericht Korneuburg. 1974.
- Österreichischer Juristentag
