= Legal maxim =

Established principle of law

A legal maxim is an established principle or proposition of law, and a species of aphorism and general maxim. The word is considered to be a variant of the Latin maxima, though no exactly analogous word to maxim is found in surviving Roman law texts. However, the treatises of many of the Roman jurists on regular definitiones and sententiae iuris are to some degree collections of maxims. Most of the Latin maxims originate from the Medieval era in European states that used Latin as their legal language.

The attitude of early English commentators towards the maximal of the law was one of adoration. In Thomas Hobbes, Doctor and Student (p. 26), they are described as of the same strength and effect in the law as statutes. Francis Bacon observed in the preface to his collection of maxims: The use of maxims will be "in deciding doubt and helping soundness of judgment, but, further, in gracing argument, in correcting unprofitable subtlety, and reducing the same to a more sound and substantial sense of law, in reclaiming vulgar errors, and, generally, in the amendment in some measure of the very nature and complexion of the whole law".

A similar note was sounded in Scotland; the pages of Morison's Dictionary of Decisions show how frequently in the older Scots law, questions respecting the rights, remedies and liabilities of individuals were determined by an immediate reference to legal maxims.

In later times, less value was to the maxims of the law, as the development of civilization and the increasing complexity of business relations showed the necessity of qualifying the propositions which they express.

== The principal collections of legal maxims ==
=== Canon law ===
- Regulæ Juris of Boniface VIII (1298)

=== English law ===
- Francis Bacon, Collection of Some Principal Rules and Maxims of the Common Law (1630);
- Noy, Treatise of the principal Grounds and Maxims of the Law of England (1641, 8th ed., 1824);
- Wingate, Maxims of Reason (1728);
- Francis, Grounds and Rudiments of Law and Equity (2nd ed. 1751);
- Lofft (annexed to his Reports, 1776);
- Branch, Principia Legis Et Æquitatis (T. A. White, 1824)
- Broom, Legal Maxims (7th ed. London, 1900).

=== Scots law ===
- Lord Trayner, Latin Maxims and Phrases (2nd ed., 1876);
- Stair, Institutions of the Law of Scotland, with Index by More (Edinburgh, 1832).

=== American treatises ===
- John Bouvier, A Law Dictionary: Adapted to the Constitution and Laws of the United States of America and of the Several States of the American Union, Revised Sixth Edition, 1856. A long list of maxims is contained in the section for the letter "M".
- Burrill, A New Law Dictionary and Glossary (J. S. Voorhies, 1860)
- A. I. Morgan, English Version of Legal Maxims (Cincinnati, 1878);
- S. S. Peloubet, Legal Maxims in Law and Equity (New York, 1880).
- Anonymous, Latin for without name, Chapter II, "A Collection of over one thousand Latin maxims, with English translations, explanatory notes, and cross-references", Sweet and Maxwell, 1915.

== See also ==
- List of legal Latin terms
- Maxims of equity
- Brocard (law)
- Philosophy of law
