= List of Latin legal terms =

List of Latin terms used in legal terminology

A number of Latin terms are used in legal terminology and legal maxims. This is a partial list of these terms, which are wholly or substantially drawn from Latin, or anglicized Law Latin.

== Common law ==
Term or phrase	Literal translation	Definition and use	English pron
a fortiori	from stronger	An a fortiori argument is an "argument from a stronger reason", meaning that, because one fact is true, a second (related and included) fact must also be true.	/ˌeɪ fɔːrtiˈoʊraɪ, ˌeɪ fɔːrʃiˈoʊraɪ/
a mensa et thoro	from table and bed	Divorce a mensa et thoro indicates legal separation without legal divorce.	/ˌeɪ ˈmɛnsə ɛt ˈθoʊroʊ/
a posteriori	from later	An argument derived after an event, having the knowledge about the event. Inductive reasoning from observations and experiments.	/ˌeɪ ˌpɒstiːrioʊraɪ/
a priori	from earlier	An argument derived before an event, without needing to have the knowledge about the event. Deductive reasoning from general principles.	/ˌeɪ praɪoʊraɪ/
a quo	from which	Regarding a court below in an appeal, either a court of first instance or an appellate court, known as the court a quo.	/ˌeɪ ˈkwoʊ/
ab extra	from outside	Concerning a case, a person may have received some funding from a 3rd party. This funding may have been considered ab extra.	/ˌæb ˈɛkstrə/
ab initio	from the beginning	"Commonly used referring to the time a contract, statute, marriage, or deed become legal. e.g. The couple was covered ab initio by her health policy."	/ˌæb ɪˈnɪʃioʊ/
absque hoc	without this	"Presenting the negative portion of a plea when pleading at common by way a special traverse."	/ˌæbskweɪ ˈhɒk/
Actio non datur non damnificato	An action is not given to one who is not injured.	The requirement that in most private legal actions, the person bringing the action must have been damaged in some way.	
Actus legis nemini facit injurium	The act of law injures no one.		
Actus non facit reum, nisi mens sit rea	No act is punishable that is not the result of a guilty mind.	The prosecution in a criminal case must prove beyond a reasonable doubt, not only a criminal act, but also a certain level of a guilty mind (mens rea), specified in the criminal statute.	
actus reus	guilty act	Part of what proves criminal liability (with mens rea).	/ˌæktəs ˈriːəs/
ad coelum	to the sky	Abbreviated from Cuius est solum eius est usque ad coelum et ad infernos which translates to "[for] whoever owns [the] soil, [it] is his all the way [up] to Heaven and [down] to Hell." The principle that the owner of a parcel of land also owns the air above and the ground below the parcel.	/ˌæd ˈsiːləm/
ad colligenda bona	to collect the goods	In cases of a disputed will, delay may endanger the assets of the deceased. Therefore, a court can give a person a writ of ad colligenda bona, which entitles them to collect and preserve the goods while their rightful owner is determined. Afterwards, that person will release the goods to the rightful owner.	/ˌæd ˌkɒlɪˈdʒɛndə ˈboʊnə/
ad hoc	for this	Generally signifies a solution designed for a specific problem or task, non-generalizable, and not intended to be able to be adapted to other purposes.	/ˌæd ˈhɒk/
ad hominem	at the person	Attempting to make a point of logic by attacking an opponent's character rather than answering their argument.	/ˌæd ˈhɒmɪnɛm/
ad idem	to the same thing	In agreement.	/ˌæd ˈaɪdəm/
ad infinitum	to infinity	To continue forever.	/ˌæd ɪnfɪˈnaɪtəm/
ad litem	for the case	Describes those designated to represent parties deemed incapable of representing themselves, such as a child or incapacitated adult.	/ˌæd ˈlaɪtɛm/
ad quod damnum	according to the harm	Used in tort law. Implies that the reward or penalty ought to correspond to the damage suffered or inflicted.	
ad valorem	according to value		/ˌæd vəˈloʊrɛm/
adjournment sine die	adjournment without a day	When an assembly adjourns without setting a date for its next meeting.	/ˌsaɪni ˈdaɪi/
aequalitas ante legem	equality before the law	All are equal before the law	/ˌiːˈkwɒlɪtæs ˈænti ˈleɪdʒɛm/
affidavit	he has sworn	A formal statement of fact.	/ˌæfɪˈdeɪvɪt/
allocatur	it is allowed	Generally, a statement from a court that a writ is allowed (i.e. granted); most commonly, a grant of leave to appeal by the Supreme Court of Pennsylvania, in reference to which the word is used equivalently to certiorari (q.v.) elsewhere.	/ˌælloʊkeɪtʊr/
alter ego	another I	A second identity living within a person.	/ˌɒltər ˈiɡoʊ/
Alteri stipulari nemo potest	No-one can alter on their own a contract		
amicus curiae	friend of the court	A person who offers information to a court regarding a case before it.	/əˈmaɪkəs ˈkjuːrii/
animus contrahendi	contractual intent	Intention to contract.	/ˈænɪməs kɑːnˈtrəhɛndi/
animus manendi	intention to remain	The subjective intent to remain indefinitely in a place so as to establish it as one's permanent residence. Along with actual residence, this is used to establish domicile. Also called animus remanendi. See diversity of citizenship.	
animus nocendi	intention to harm	The subjective state of mind of the author of a crime, with reference to the exact knowledge of illegal content of their behaviour, and of its possible consequences.	
animus possidendi	intention to possess	"In order to claim possessory rights, an individual must establish physical control of the res and the intention to possess (i.e. animus possidendi)"	
animus revertendi	intention to return	"Wild animals, such as bees and homing pigeons, that by habit go 'home' to their possessor. Used when discussing ferae naturae."	
animus testandi	testamentary intent	The intention, when writing a document, that the document should serve as a last will and testament.	
ante	before	“An antenuptial agreement is a contract between two people that is executed before marriage.”	
(in) arguendo	for the sake of argument		
bona fide	in good faith	Implies sincere good intention regardless of outcome.	/ˈboʊnə ˈfaɪdi/
bona vacantia	ownerless goods		
cadit quaestio	the question falls	Indicates that a settlement to a dispute or issue has been reached, and the issue is now resolved.	
casus belli	case of war	The justification for acts of war.	/ˈkeɪsəs ˈbɛlaɪ/
caveat	May he beware	When used by itself, refers to a qualification, or warning.	
caveat emptor	Let the buyer beware	In addition to the general warning, also refers to a legal doctrine wherein a buyer could not get relief from a seller for defects present on property which rendered it unfit for use.	/ˈkæviæt ˈɛmptɔːr/
certiorari	to be apprised	A type of writ seeking judicial review.	/ˌsɜːrʃiəˈreɪraɪ, ˌsɜːrʃiəˈreɪri/
cessante ratione legis cessat ipsa lex	when the reason for a law ceases, so does the law itself	Herbert Broom′s text of 1858 on legal maxims lists the phrase under the heading ″Rules of logic″, stating: Reason is the soul of the law, and when the reason of any particular law ceases, so does the law itself. Used as a reason for acquittal in The Case of the Speluncean Explorers.	
ceteris paribus	with other things the same	More commonly rendered in English as "All other things being equal."	/ˌsɛtərɪs ˈpærɪbəs/
compos mentis	having command of mind	Of sound mind. Also used in the negative "Non compos mentis", meaning "Not of sound mind".	/ˈkɒmpɒs ˈmɛntɪs/
condicio sine qua non	A condition without which it could not be	An indispensable and essential action, condition, or ingredient.	
consensus ad idem	agreement to the same	Meeting of the minds, mutual assent, or concurrence of wills. Parties must be of one mind and their promises must relate to the same subject or object Also consensus in idem.	
contra	against	Used in case citations to indicate that the cited source directly contradicts the point being made.	
contra legem	against the law	Used when a court or tribunal hands down a decision that is contrary to the laws of the governing state.	
contradictio in adjecto	contradiction in what is added	A contradiction where the modifier contradicts the modified (e.g., a square triangle).	
contra proferentem	against the one bringing forth	Used in contract law to stipulate that an ambiguous term in a contract shall be interpreted against the interests of the party that insisted upon the term's inclusion. Prevents the intentional additions of ambiguous terminology from being exploited by the party who insisted on its inclusion.	
coram non judice	before one who is not a judge	Refers to a legal proceeding without a judge, or with a judge who does not have proper jurisdiction.	
corpus delicti	body of the crime	A person cannot be convicted of a crime, unless it can be proven that the crime was even committed.	/ˈkɔːrpəs dɪˈlɪktaɪ/
corpus juris	body of law	The complete collection of laws of a particular jurisdiction or court.	/ˈkɔːrpəs ˈdʒuːrɪs/
corpus juris civilis	body of civil law	The complete collection of civil laws of a particular jurisdiction or court. Also sometimes used to refer to the Code of Justinian.	/ˈkɔːrpəs ˈdʒuːrɪs sɪˈvaɪlɪs/
corpus juris gentium	body of the law of nations	The complete collection of international law.	
corpus juris secundum		An encyclopedia of US law drawn from US Federal and State court decisions.	
crimen falsi	crime of falsifying	Forgery.	
cui bono	as a benefit to whom?	Suggests that the perpetrator(s) of a crime can often be found by investigating those who would have benefited financially from the crime, even if it is not immediately obvious.	
curia advisari vult	the court wishes to consider	Signifies the intent of a court to consider the points of law argued during advocacy, prior to judgement.	
de bonis asportatis	carrying goods away	Specifies that larceny was taking place in addition to any other crime named. E.g. "trespass de bonis asportatis".	
debellatio	warring down	Complete annihilation of a warring party, bringing about the end of the conflict.	
de bonis non administratis	of goods not administered	Assets of an estate remaining after the death (or removal) of the designated estate administrator. An "administrator de bonis non administratis" will then be appointed to dispose of these goods.	
de die in diem	from day to day	Generally refers to a type of labor in which the worker is paid fully at the completion of each day's work.	
de facto	in fact	Literally "from fact"; often used to mean something that is true in practice, but has not been officially instituted or endorsed. "For all intents and purposes". Cf. de jure.	
de futuro	concerning the future	At a future date.	
de integro	concerning the whole	Often used to mean "start it all over", in the context of "repeat de integro".	
de jure	according to law	Literally "from law"; something that is established in law, whether or not it is true in general practice. Cf. de facto.	
de lege ferenda	of the law as it should be	Used in the context of "how the law should be", such as for proposed legislation.	
de lege lata	of the law as it is	Concerning the law as it exists, without consideration of how things should be.	
de minimis	about the smallest things	Various legal areas concerning small amounts or small degrees.	
de minimis non curat lex	the law is not concerned with minimal things	The rule that the law will not remedy an injury that is minimal.	
de novo	anew	Often used in the context of "trial de novo" – a new trial ordered when the previous one failed to reach a conclusion.	
deorum injuriae diis curae	The gods take care of injuries to the gods	Blasphemy is a crime against God, rather than against the State.	
dictum	(thing) said	A statement given some weight or consideration due to the respect given the person making it.	
doli incapax	incapable of guilt	Presumption that young children or persons with diminished mental capacity cannot form the intent to commit a crime.	
dolus bonus		Justinian Digest	
dolus malus		Justinian Digest	
dolus specialis	Specific deceit	Heavily used in the context of genocide in international law.	
domitae naturae	tame by nature	Tame or domesticated animal. Also called mansuetae naturae. Opposite of ferae naturae (below)	
donatio mortis causa	deathbed gift	Gift causa mortis; "The donor, contemplating imminent death, declares words of present gifting and delivers the gift to the donee or someone who clearly takes possession on behalf of the donee. The gift becomes effective at death but remains revocable until that time."	
dramatis personae	persons of the drama		
duces tecum	bring with you	A "subpoena duces tecum" is a summons to produce physical evidence for a trial.	
ejusdem generis	of the same class	Known as a "canon of construction", it states that when a limited list of specific things also includes a more general class, that the scope of that more general class shall be limited to other items more like the specific items in the list.	
eo nomine	by that name		
erga omnes	towards all	Refers to rights or obligations that are owed towards all.	
ergo	therefore		
erratum	having been made in error		
et al.	and others	Abbreviation of et alii, meaning "and others".	
et cetera	and other things	Generally used in the sense of "and so forth".	
et seq.	and the following things	Abbreviation of et sequens, meaning "and the following ones". Used in citations to indicate that the cited portion extends to the pages following the cited page.	
et uxor	and wife	Usually used instead of naming a man's wife as a party in a case.	/ˌɛt ˈʌksɔːr/
et vir	and husband	Usually used instead of naming a woman's husband as a party in a case.	/ˌɛt ˈvɜːr/
ex aequo et bono	of equity and [the] good	Usually defined as "what is right and good." Used to describe the power of a judge or arbiter to consider only what is fair and good for the specific case, and not necessarily what the law may require. In courts, usually only done if all parties agree.	
ex ante	of before	Essentially meaning "before the event", usually used when forecasting future events.	/ˌɛks ˈænti/
ex cathedra	from the chair	Where chair refers to authority or position. Authority derived from one's position.	
ex concessis	from what has been conceded already	Also known as "argument from commitment", a type of valid ad hominem argument.	
ex delicto	from a transgression	The consequence of a crime or tort.	
ex demissione	from a transgression	part of the title of the old action of ejectment Jones v. Doe ex dem. Smith	
Ex dolo malo non oritur actio	No action arises from harm		
ex facie	on the face	If a contract is blatantly and obviously incorrect or illegal, it can be considered void ex facie without any further analysis or arguments.	
ex fida bona	good business norms		
ex gratia	by favor	Something done voluntarily and with no expectation of a legal liability arising therefrom.	
ex officio	from the office	Something done or realized by the fact of holding an office or position.	
ex parte	from [for] one party	A decision reached, or case brought, by or for one party without the other party being present.	
ex post	from after	Based on knowledge of the past.	
ex post facto	from a thing done afterward	Commonly said as "after the fact."	
ex post facto law		A retroactive law. E.g. a law that makes illegal an act that was not illegal when it was done.	
ex proprio motu	by [one's] own motion	Commonly spoken as "by one's own accord."	
ex rel	[arising] out of the narration [of the relator]	Abbreviation of ex relatione. Used when the government brings a case that arises from the information conveyed to it by a third party ("relator").	
ex tempore	At the time	Referring to a decision delivered at the time of a hearing, rather than having the judgment reserved for a later date.	
exempli gratia	for the sake of example	Usually abbreviated "e.g.".	
ex tunc	from then	Term used in contract law to specify terms that are voided or confirmed in effect from the execution of the contract. Cf. ex nunc.	
Ex turpi causa non oritur actio			
ex nunc	from now on	Term used in contract law to specify terms that are voided or confirmed in effect only in the future and not prior to the contract, or its adjudication. Cf. ex tunc.	
extant	existing	Refers to things that are currently existing at a given point, rather than things that are no longer so.	
facio ut facias	I do, that you may do	A type of contract wherein one party agrees to do work for the other, in order that the second party can then perform some work for the first in exchange.	
factum	deed	1. an assured statement made; 2. completion of a will and all its parts to make it valid and legal; 3). book of facts and law presented in a Canadian court.	
favor contractus	favor of the contract	A concept in treaty law that prefers the maintaining of a contract over letting it expire for purely procedural reasons.	
felo de se	felon of himself	A suicide. This archaic term stems from English common law, where suicide was legally a felony, thus a person who committed suicide was treated as a felon for purposes of estate disposal.	
ferae naturae	wild animals by nature	Wild animals residing on unowned property do not belong to any party in a dispute on the land. Opposite of domitae naturae (above).	
fiat	Let it be done.	A warrant issued by a judge for some legal proceedings.	
fieri facias	May you cause to be done.	A writ ordering the local law enforcement to ensure that damages awarded by the court are properly recovered. A writ of execution.	
fortis attachiamentum, validior praesumptionem	strong attachment, the stronger presumption	When determining whether a chattel is a fixture: "size doesn't matter, how much or degree chattel is attached to 'land' and to 'what' "	
forum non conveniens	disagreeable forum	A concept wherein a court refuses to hear a particular matter, citing a more appropriate forum for the issue to be decided.	/ˈfoʊrəm nɒn kənˈviːniɛnz/
fumus boni iuris	smoke of a good right	Refers to having a sufficient legal basis to bring legal action.	
functus officio	having performed his office	A person, court, statute, or legal document that has no legal authority, because its original legal purpose has been fulfilled.	
gravamen	things weighing down	The basic element or complaint of a lawsuit.	/ɡrəˈveɪmɛn/
guardian ad litem	guardian for the case	An independent party appointed in family law disputes to represent parties that cannot represent themselves, such as minors, developmentally disabled, or elderly.	
habeas corpus	May you have the body.	A writ used to challenge the legality of detention. Orders the detaining party to "have the (living) body" of the detained brought before the court where the detention will be investigated.	/ˈheɪbiəs ˈkɔːrpəs/
hostis humani generis	enemy of the human race	A party considered to be the enemy of all nations, such as maritime pirates.	
imprimatur	Let it be printed.	An authorization for a document to be printed. Used in the context of approval by a religious body or other censoring authority.	
in absentia	in absence	A legal proceeding conducted without the presence of one party is said to be conducted in absentia, e.g., trial in absentia or being sentenced in absentia.	
in articulo mortis	at the moment of death	Often used in probate law, as well as for testimony in the sense of a dying declaration.	
in camera	in the chamber	Conducted in private, or in secret. The opposite of in open court.	
in curia	in court	Conducted in open court. The opposite of in camera.	
in esse	in existence	Actually existing in reality. Opposite of in posse.	
in extenso	in the extended	In extended form, or at full length. Often used to refer to publication of documents, where it means the full unabridged document is published.	
in extremis	in the extreme	In extreme circumstances. Often used to refer to "at the point of death."	
in flagrante delicto	in blazing offense	Caught in the actual act of committing a crime. Often used as a euphemism for a couple caught in the act of sexual intercourse, though it technically refers to being "caught in the act" of any misdeed.	
in forma pauperis	in the manner of a pauper	Someone unable to afford the costs associated with a legal proceeding. As this will not be a barrier to seeking justice, such persons are given in forma pauperis status (usually abbreviated IFP), wherein most costs are waived or substantially reduced.	/ɪn ˌfɔːrmə ˈpɔːpərɪs/
in futuro	in the future	Refers to things to come, or things that may occur later but are not so now. As in in futuro debts, i.e. debts which become due and payable in the future.	/ɪn fjuːˈtjuːroʊ/
in haec verba	in these words	Used when including text in a complaint verbatim, where its appearance in that form is germane to the case, or is required to be included.	
in limine	at the threshold	A motion to a judge in a case that is heard and considered outside the presence of the jury.	
in loco parentis	in the place of a parent	Used to refer to a person or entity assuming the normal parental responsibilities for a minor. This can be used in transfers of legal guardianship, or in the case of schools or other institutions that act in the place of the parents on a day-to-day basis.	/ɪn ˌloʊkoʊ pəˈrɛntɪs/
in mitius	in the milder	A type of retroactive law that decriminalizes offenses committed in the past. Also known as an amnesty law.	
in omnibus	in all	Used to mean "in every respect." Something applying to every aspect of a situation.	
in pari delicto	in equal offense	Used when both parties to a case are equally at fault.	
in pari materia	in the same matter	Refers to a situation where a law or statute may be ambiguous, and similar laws applying to the matter are used to interpret the vague one.	
in personam	in person	Used in the context of "directed at this particular person", refers to a judgement or subpoena directed at a specific named individual. Cf. in rem.	
in pleno	in full		
in posse	in possibility	Not in existence but having a potential to come into existence.	
in propria persona	in one's own person	Said of one who represents themselves in court without the [official] assistance of an attorney.	
in re	in the matter [of]	Used in the title of a decision or comment to identify the matter they are related to; usually used for a case where the proceeding is in rem or quasi in rem and not in personam (e.g. probate or bankrupt estate, guardianship, application for laying out a public highway) and occasionally for an ex parte proceeding (e.g. application for a writ of habeas corpus).	/ɪn ˈriː/
in rem	about a thing	Used in the context of a case against property, as opposed to a particular person. See also in rem jurisdiction. Cf. in personam.	/ɪn ˈrɛm/
in situ	in position	Often used in the context of decisions or rulings about a property or thing "left in place" after the case as it was before.	/ɪn ˈsaɪtjuː, ɪn ˈsɪtjuː/
in terrorem	in order to frighten	A warning or threat to sue, made in the hopes of convincing the other party to take action to avoid a lawsuit.	
in terrorem clause	clause "in order to frighten"	A clause in a will that threatens any party who contests the will with being disinherited. Also called a no-contest clause.	
in toto	in total		/ɪn ˈtoʊtoʊ/
indicia	indications	Often used in copyright notices. Refers to distinctive markings that identify a piece of intellectual property.	
infra	below or under	"See below". Typically used in briefs, memoranda, and articles to direct the reader to some point later in the document for further elaboration.	
iniuria sine damno	injury without financial or property loss	It was stated in Ashby v. White that the law makes a presumption of damage in the absence of actual perceptible damage or financial loss and that the infringement of a right was enough for iniuria sine damno to be actionable.	/ɪnˈjuːriə ˈsaɪni ˈdæmnoʊ/
innuendo	by nodding	An intimation about someone or something, made indirectly or vaguely suggesting the thing being implied. Often used when the implied thing is negative or derogatory.	
inter alia	among others	Used to indicate an item cited has been pulled from a larger or more complete list.	/ˌɪntər ˈeɪliə/
inter rusticos	among rustics	Refers to contract, debts, or other agreements made between parties who are not legal professionals.	
inter se	amongst themselves	Refers to obligations between members of the same group or party, differentiated from the whole party's obligations to another party.	
inter vivos	between the living	Refers to a gift or other non-sale transfer between living parties. This is in contrast to a will, where the transfer takes effect upon one party's death.	/ˌɪntər ˈvaɪvɒs/
intra	within		
intra fauces terrae	within the jaws of the land	This term refers to a nation's territorial waters.	
intra legem	within the law	Used in various contexts to refer to the legal foundation for a thing.	
intra vires	within the powers	Something done which requires legal authority, and the act is performed accordingly. Cf. ultra vires.	
ipse dixit	He himself said it.	An assertion given undue weight solely by virtue of the person making the assertion.	/ˈɪpsi ˈdɪksɪt/
ipsissima verba	the very words	Referring to a document or ruling that is being quoted by another.	
ipso facto	by the fact itself	Used in the context that one event is a direct and immediate consequence of another. "In and of itself."	/ˈɪpsoʊ ˈfæktoʊ/
ipso jure	the law itself	By operation of law.	
ius	law	For ius and various terms incorporating ius, see jus below and the relevant term incorporating jus	
ius civile vigilantibus scriptum est	civil law is written for the vigilant	Noting that private law is written for those persons who are vigilant in pursuing their interests and diligently care for their own affairs.	
jurat	(He) swears	Appears at the end of an affidavit, where the party making the affirmation signs the oath, and the information on whom the oath was sworn before is placed.	
juris privati	of private right	Not clothed with a public interest.	
jus	law, right	Essentially: law.	
jus accrescendi	right of survivorship	Right of survivorship: In property law, on the death of one joint tenant, that tenant's interest passes automatically to the surviving tenant(s) to hold jointly until the estate is held by a sole tenant. The only way to defeat the right of survivorship is to sever the joint tenancy during the lifetime of the parties, the right of survivorship takes priority over a will or interstate accession rules.	
jus ad bellum	laws to war	Refers to legalities considered before entering into a war, to ensure it is legal to go to war initially. Not to be confused with ius in bello (q.v.), the "laws of war" concerning how war is carried out.	
jus civile	civil law	A codified set of laws concerning citizenry, and how the laws apply to them.	
jus cogens	compelling law	Internationally agreed laws that bear no deviation, and do not require treaties to be in effect. An example is law prohibiting genocide.	
jus gentium	law of nations	Customary law followed by all nations. Nations being at peace with one another, without having to have an actual peace treaty in force, would be an example of this concept.	
jus in bello	law in war	Laws governing the conduct of parties in war.	
jus inter gentes	law between the peoples	Laws governing treaties and international agreements.	
jus legationis	right of legation	The right to send and receive diplomatic representation	
jus naturale	natural law	Laws common to all people, that the average person would find reasonable, regardless of their nationality.	
jus primae noctis	right of the first night	Supposed right of the lord of an estate to take the virginity of women in his estate on their wedding night.	
jus sanguinis	right of blood	Social law concept wherein citizenship of a nation is determined by having one or both parents being citizens.	/ˈdʒʌs ˈsæŋɡwɪnɪs/
jus soli	right of soil	Social law concept wherein citizenship of a nation is determined by place of birth.	/ˈdʒʌs ˈsoʊlaɪ/
jus tertii	law of the third	Arguments made by a third party in disputes over possession, the intent of which is to question one of the principal parties' claims of ownership or rights to ownership.	
Jus tractatuum			
lacuna	void, gap	A situation arising that is not covered by any law, especially when related situations are covered by the law or where the situation appears to fall "between" multiple laws. Generally used in International Law, which is less comprehensive than most domestic legal systems.	
lex communis	common law	Alternate form of jus commune. Refers to common facets of civil law that underlie all aspects of the law.	
lex fori		the law of the country in which an action is brought out	
lex lata	the carried law	The law as it has been enacted.	
lex loci	the law of the place	The law of the country, state, or locality where the matter under litigation took place. Usually used in contract law, to determine which laws govern the contract.	/ˈlɛks ˈloʊsaɪ/
lex scripta	written law	Law that specifically codifies something, as opposed to common law or customary law.	
liberum veto	free veto	An aspect of a unanimous voting system, whereby any member can end discussion on a proposed law.	
lingua franca	the Frankish language	A language common to an area that is spoken by all, even if not their mother tongue. Term derives from the name given to a common language used by traders in the Mediterranean basin dating from the Middle Ages.	
lis alibi pendens	lawsuit elsewhere pending	Refers to requesting a legal dispute be heard that is also being heard by another court. To avoid possibly contradictory judgements, this request will not be granted.	
lis pendens	suit pending	Often used in the context of public announcements of legal proceedings to come. Compare pendente lite (below).	
locus	place		
locus delicti	place of the crime	Shorthand version of Lex locus delicti commissi. The "scene of the crime".	
locus in quo	the place in which	The location where a cause of action arose.	
locus poenitentiae	place of repentance	When one party withdraws from a contract before all parties are bound.	
locus standi	place of standing	The right of a party to appear and be heard before a court.	/ˈloʊkəs ˈstændaɪ/
mala fide	(in) bad faith	A condition of being fraudulent or deceptive in act or belief.	
malum in se	wrong in itself	Something considered a universal wrong or evil, regardless of the system of laws in effect.	
malum prohibitum	prohibited wrong	Something wrong or illegal by virtue of it being expressly prohibited, that might not otherwise be so.	
mandamus	we command	A writ issue by a higher court to a lower one, ordering that court or related officials to perform some administrative duty. Often used in the context of legal oversight of government agencies.	/mænˈdeɪməs/
mare clausum	closed sea	A body of water under the jurisdiction of a state or nation, to which access is not permitted, or is tightly regulated.	/ˈmeɪri ˈklɔːzəm/
mare liberum	open sea	A body of water open to all. Typically a synonym for International Waters, or in other legal parlance, the "High Seas".	
mea culpa	through my fault	An acknowledgement of wrongdoing.	/ˈmeɪ.ə ˈkul.pə/
mens rea	guilty mind	One of the requirements for a crime to be committed, the other being actus reus, the guilt act. This essentially is the basis for the notion that those without sufficient mental capability cannot be judged guilty of a crime.	/ˈmɛns ˈriːə/
modus operandi	manner of operation	A person's particular way of doing things. Used when using behavioral analysis while investigating a crime. Often abbreviated "M.O."	/ˈmoʊdəs ɒpəˈrændaɪ, ˈmoʊdəs ɒpəˈrændi/
mortis causa	in contemplation of death	Gift or trust that is made in contemplation of death.	
mos pro lege	custom for law	That which is the usual custom has the force of law.	
motion in limine	motion at the start	Motions offered at the start of a trial, often to suppress or pre-allow certain evidence or testimony.	
mutatis mutandis	having changed [the things that] needed to be changed	A caution to a reader when using one example to illustrate a related but slightly different situation. The caution is that the reader must adapt the example to change what is needed for it to apply to the new situation.	
ne exeat	let him not exit [the republic]	Shortened version of ne exeat republica: "let him not exit the republic". A writ to prevent one party to a dispute from leaving (or being taken) from the court's jurisdiction.	/ˈniː ˈɛksiæt/
Nemo dat quod non habet	Nobody can give what he has not	Transfer of property ownership. If someone who don't own the property, he or she can't transfer to the buyer.	
Nemo debet bis vexari (pro una et eadem causa)	No-one should be tried twice (for one and the same charge)	It is a principle of double jeopardy (autrefois acquit) where a person should not be tried twice on the same matter.	
Nemo iudex in causa sua	No-one should be a judge in his own case.	It is a principle of natural justice that no person can judge a case in which they have an interest.	
Nemo potest dare quod suum non est	No one can give what he possesses not	inter alia, see Dante on monarchy	
Nemo potest esse tenens et dominus	No one can at the same time be a tenant and a landlord	Nor can one person covenant with himself and others jointly	
Nemo potest mutare consilium suum in alterius iniuriam	Nobody can change his own purpose to another's injury		
Nemo potest nisi quod de jure potest	A person can do only things, which s/he can do lawfully.	Under law, a thing which cannot be lawfully performed is considered not within one's power.	
Nemo potest praecise cogi ad factum	Nobody can be forced to a specific act		
Nemo potest venire contra factum proprium	No-one can act in a way contrary to his own prior actions.	doctrines of promissory estoppel and equitable estoppel; prohibited for a party to act in such a way that contradicts a previous act of his own on which the other party relied, thus causing a detriment to the latter.	
Nemo potest facere per alium quod per se non potest	No one can do through another what he cannot do himself.		
nihil dicit	He says nothing.	A judgement rendered in the absence of a plea, or in the event one party refuses to cooperate in the proceedings.	
nisi	unless	A decree that does not enter into force unless some other specified condition is met.	/ˈnaɪsaɪ/
nisi prius	unless first	Refers to the court of original jurisdiction in a given matter.	/ˈnaɪsaɪ ˈpraɪəs/
nolle prosequi	not to prosecute	A statement from the prosecution that they are voluntarily discontinuing (or will not initiate) prosecution of a matter.	/ˈnɒli ˈprɒsɪkwaɪ/
nolo contendere	I do not wish to argue	A type of plea whereby the defendant neither admits nor denies the charge. Commonly interpreted as "No contest."	/ˈnoʊloʊ kɒnˈtɛndɪri/
non adimpleti contractus	of a non-completed contract	In the case where a contract imposes specific obligations on both parties, one side cannot sue the other for failure to meet their obligations, if the plaintiff has not themselves met their own.	
non compos mentis	not in possession of [one's] mind	Not having mental capacity to perform some legal act	
non constat	It is not certain.	Refers to information given by one who is not supposed to give testimony, such as an attorney bringing up new information that did not come from a witness. Such information is typically nullified.	
non est factum	It is not [my] deed.	A method whereby a signatory to a contract can invalidate it by showing that his signature to the contract was made unintentionally or without full understanding of the implications.	
non est inventus	He was not found.	Reported by a sheriff on writ when the defendant cannot be found in his county or jurisdiction.	
non liquet	It is not clear.	A type of verdict where positive guilt or innocence cannot be determined. Also called "not proven" in legal systems with such verdicts.	
non obstante verdicto	notwithstanding the verdict	A circumstance where the judge may override the jury verdict and reverse or modify the decision.	
novus actus interveniens	a new action coming between	A break in causation (and therefore probably liability) because something else has happened to remove the causal link.	
noscitur a sociis	It is known by the company it keeps.	An ambiguous word or term can be clarified by considering the whole context in which it is used, without having to define the term itself.	
nota bene	note well	A term used to direct the reader to cautionary or qualifying statements for the main text.	
Nullum crimen sine lege	No-one can face punishment except for an act that was criminalized before he performed the act		
Nulla poena sine culpa	no punishment without fault	One cannot be punished for something that they are not guilty of.	
nudum pactum	naked promise	An unenforceable promise, due to the absence of consideration or value exchanged for the promise.	
nulla bona	no goods	Notation made when a defendant has no tangible property available to be seized in order to comply with a judgement.	
nunc pro tunc	now for then	An action by a court to correct a previous procedural or clerical error.	
obiter dictum	a thing said in passing	In law, an observation by a judge on some point of law not directly relevant to the case before him, and thus neither requiring his decision nor serving as a precedent, but nevertheless of persuasive authority. In general, any comment, remark or observation made in passing.	
omnia praesumuntur rite essa acta	Everything is presumed right about this act	When reviewing official acts, the presumption that all formalities were complied with.	
onus probandi		Burden of proof.	
ore tenus	(evidence) presented orally		
pace	with peace	Used to say 'contrary to the opinion of.' It is a polite way of marking a speaker's disagreement with someone or some body of thought.	/ˈpɑːtʃeɪ/
par delictum	equal fault	Used when both parties to a dispute are at fault.	
parens patriae	parent of the nation	Refers to the power of the State to act as parent to a child when the legal parents are unable or unwilling.	
pari passu	on equal footing	Equal ranking, equal priority (usually referring to creditors).	
partus sequitur ventrem	Offspring follows the belly	Legal status of children of slaves is the same as their mother's.	
pendente lite	while the litigation is pending	Court orders used to provide relief until the final judgement is rendered. Commonly used in divorce proceedings. The adverbial form of lis pendens (above).	
per capita	by head	Dividing money up strictly and equally according to the number of beneficiaries	
per contra	by that against	Legal shorthand for "in contrast to".	
per curiam	through the court	A decision delivered by a multi-judge panel, such as an appellate court, in which the decision is said to be authored by the court itself, instead of situations where those individual judges supporting the decision are named.	/ˌpɜːr ˈkjuːriæm/
per incuriam	by their neglect	A judgement given without reference to precedent.	
per minas	through threats	Used as a defence, when illegal acts were performed under duress.	
per proxima amici	by or through the next friend	Employed when an adult brings suit on behalf of a minor, who was unable to maintain an action on his own behalf at common law.	
per quod	by which	Used in legal documents in the same sense as "whereby". A per quod statement is typically used to show that specific acts had consequences which form the basis for the legal action.	
per se	by itself	Something that is, as a matter of law.	
per stirpes	by branch	An estate of a decedent is distributed per stirpes, if each branch of the family is to receive an equal share of an estate.	
periculum in mora	danger in delay	A condition given to support requests for urgent action, such as a protective order or restraining order.	
persona non grata	unwelcome person	A person who is officially considered unwelcome by a host country in which they are residing in a diplomatic capacity. The person is typically expelled to their home country.	/pərˈsoʊnə nɒn ˈɡrɑːtə, pərˈsoʊnə nɒn ˈɡreɪtə/
posse comitatus	power of the county	A body of armed citizens pressed into service by legal authority, to keep the peace or pursue a fugitive.	/ˈpɒsi ˌkɒmɪˈteɪtəs/
post hoc ergo propter hoc	after this, therefore because of this	A logical fallacy that suggests that an action causes an effect simply because the action occurred before the effect.	
post mortem	after death	Refers to an autopsy, or as a qualification as to when some event occurred.	
post mortem auctoris	after the author's death	Used in reference to intellectual property rights, which usually are based around the author's lifetime.	
postliminium	return from the other	Refers to the return of legal standing and property of a person who returns to the jurisdiction of Rome	
praetor peregrinus	magistrate of foreigners	The Roman praetor (magistrate) responsible for matters involving non-Romans.	
prima facie	at first face	A matter that appears to be sufficiently based in the evidence as to be considered true.	/ˈpraɪmə ˈfeɪʃii/
pro bono	for good	Professional work done for free.	/ˈproʊ ˈboʊnoʊ/
pro bono publico	for the public good		/ˈproʊ ˈboʊnoʊ ˈpʌblɪkoʊ/
pro forma	as a matter of form	Things done as formalities.	
pro hac vice	for this turn	Refers to a lawyer who is allowed to participate (only) in a specific case, despite being in a jurisdiction in which he has not been generally admitted.	
pro per	abbreviation of propria persona, meaning "one's own person"	Representing oneself, without counsel. Also known as pro se representation.	
pro rata	from the rate	A calculation adjusted based on a proportional value relevant to the calculation. An example would be a tenant being charged a portion of a month's rent based on having lived there less than a full month. The amount charged would be proportional to the time occupied.	
pro se	for himself	Representing oneself, without counsel. Also known as pro per representation.	/ˌproʊ ˈsiː, ˌproʊ ˈseɪ/
pro tanto	for so much	A partial payment of an award or claim, based on the defendant's ability to pay.	
pro tem	abbreviation of pro tempore, meaning "for the time being"	Something, such as an office held, that is temporary.	
pro tempore	for the time being	Something, such as an office held, that is temporary.	
propria persona	proper person	Refers to one representing themselves without the services of a lawyer. Also known as pro per representation.	
qua	which; as	In the capacity of.	
quae ipso usu consumuntur	Consumed by the use itself	Used in relation with objects whose purpose is to be consumed or destroyed. Examples include food, fuel, medicine, matches or money.	
quaeritur	It is sought.	The question is raised. Used to declare that a question is being asked in the following verbiage.	
quaere	query	Used in legal drafts to call attention to some uncertainty or inconsistency in the material being cited.	
quantum	how much		
quantum meruit	as much as it deserves; as much as she or he has earned	In contract law, a quasi-contractual remedy that permits partial reasonable payment for an incomplete piece of work (services and/or materials), assessed proportionately, where no price is established when the request is made. In contract law, and in particular the requirement for consideration, if no fixed price is agreed upon for the service and/or materials, then one party would request a reasonable price for the said services and/or materials at the end of the job. A common example would be a plumber requested to fix a leak in the middle of the night.	
quantum valebant	as much as they were worth	Under Common Law, a remedy to compute reasonable damages when a contract has been breached – the implied promise of payment of a reasonable price for goods. In contract law, for requirements of consideration, reasonable worth for goods delivered. Usage: quantum meruit has replaced quantum valebant in consideration; in the case of contract remedy, quantum valebant is being used less, and could be considered obsolete.	
quasi	as if	Resembling or being similar to something, without actually being that thing.	
qui tam	abbreviation of qui tam pro domino rege quam pro se ipso in hac parte sequitur, meaning "who pursues in this action as much for the king as himself".	In a qui tam action, one who assists the prosecution of a case is entitled to a proportion of any fines or penalties assessed.	
quid pro quo	this for that	An equal exchange of goods or services, or of money (or other consideration of equal value) for some goods or services.	
quo ante	as before	Returning to a specific state of affairs which preceded some defined action.	
quo warranto	by what warrant	A request made to someone exercising some power, to show by what legal right they are exercising that power. A type of writ.	
quoad hoc	as to this	Used to mean "with respect to" some named thing, such as when stating what the law is in regards to that named thing.	
R	Rex or Regina	King or Queen. In British cases, will see R v Freeman meaning Rex against Freeman. Changes with King or Queen on throne.	
ratio decidendi	reason for the decision	The point in a legal proceeding, or the legal precedent so involved, which led to the final decision being what it was.	
ratio scripta	written reason	The popular opinion of Roman law, held by those in the Medieval period.	
rationae soli	by reason of the soil	"Certain rights may arise by virtue of ownership of the soil upon which wild animals are found."	
rebus sic stantibus	things thus standing	A qualification in a treaty or contract, that allows for nullification in the event fundamental circumstances change.	
reddendo singula singulis	referring solely to the last	The canon of construction that in a list of items containing a qualifying phrase at the end, the qualifier refers only to the last item in the list.	
replevin	claim and delivery	An action to recover personal property said or claimed to be unlawfully taken. The writ or procedure of such an action. A personal action which lies to recover possession of goods and chattle wrongfully taken or detained. Originally, it was a remedy peculiar to cases for wrongful distress, but it may generally now be brought in all cases of wrongful taking or detention.	
res	thing, matter, issue, affair		
res communis	common to all	Property constructs like airspace and water rights are said to be res communis – that is, a thing common to all, and that could not be the subject of ownership. With airspace, the difficulty has been to identify where the fee simple holder's rights to the heavens end. Water is a bit more defined – it is common until captured.	
res derelictae	abandoned goods	Material property abandoned by its owner	
res ipsa loquitur	the thing speaks for itself	The principle that the occurrence of an accident implies negligence. This principle allows the elements of duty of care, breach, and causation to be inferred from an injury that does not ordinarily occur without negligence.	
res gestae	a thing done	Differing meaning depending on what type of law is involved. May refer to the complete act of a felony, from start to finish, or may refer to statements given that may be exempt from hearsay rules.	
res judicata	a matter judged	A matter that has been finally adjudicated, meaning no further appeals or legal actions by the involved parties is now possible.	/ˈriːz dʒuːdɪˈkeɪtə, ˈreɪz, dʒuːdɪˈkɑːtə/
res nova	a new thing	A question of law on which no court has previously ruled, or a factual situation about which no court has previously ruled; a legal case without a precedent	
res nullius	nobody's thing	Ownerless property or goods. Such property or goods are able and subject to being owned by anybody.	
res publica	public affair	All things subject to concern by the citizenry. The root of the word republic.	
respondeat superior	Let the master answer.	A concept that the master (e.g. employer) is responsible for the actions of his subordinates (e.g. employees).	
scandalum magnatum	scandal of the magnates	Defamation against a peer in British law. Now repealed as a specific offense.	
scienter	knowingly	Used when offenses or torts were committed with the full awareness of the one so committing.	
scire facias	Let them know.	A writ, directing local officials to officially inform a party of official proceedings concerning them.	
scire feci	I have made known.	The official response of the official serving a writ of scire facias, informing the court that the writ has been properly delivered.	
secundum formam statuti	According to the form of the statute.		
se defendendo	self-defence	The act of defending one's own person or property, or the well-being or property of another.	
seriatim	in series	Describes the process in which the court hears assorted matters in a specific order. Also refers to an occasion where a multiple-judge panel will issue individual opinions from the members, rather than a single ruling from the entire panel.	
sine die	without day	Used when the court is adjourning without specifying a date to re-convene. See also adjournment sine die.	
sine qua non	without which, nothing	Refers to some essential event or action, without which there can be no specified consequence.	
situs	the place	Used to refer to laws specific to the location where specific property exists, or where an offense or tort was committed.	
stare decisis	to stand by [things] decided	The obligation of a judge to stand by a prior precedent.	/ˈsteɪri dɪˈsaɪsɪs/
status quo status quo ante statu quo	the state in which	In contract law, in a case of innocent representation, the injured party is entitled to be replaced in statu quo. Note the common usage is status quo from the Latin status quo ante, the "state in which before" or "the state of affairs that existed previously."	
stratum	a covering, from neuter past participle of sternere, to spread	1) In property law, condominiums has said to occupy stratum many stories about the ground. 2) Stratum can also be a societial level made up of individuals with similar status of social, cultural or economic nature. 3) Stratum can refer to classification in an organized system along the lines of layers, levels, divisions, or similar grouping.	
sua sponte	of its own accord	Some action taken by the public prosecutor or another official body, without the prompting of a plaintiff or another party. (compare ex proprio motu, ex mero motu which are used for courts).	
sub judice	under the judge	Refers to a matter currently being considered by the court.	
sub modo	subject to modification	Term in contract law that allows limited modifications to a contract after the original form has been agreed to by all parties.	
sub nomine	under the name	Abbreviated sub nom.; used in case citations to indicate that the official name of a case changed during the proceedings, usually after appeal (e.g., rev'd sub nom. and aff'd sub nom.)	
sub silentio	under silence	A ruling, order, or other court action made without specifically stating the ruling, order, or action. The effect of the ruling or action is implied by related and subsequent actions, but not specifically stated.	
subpoena	under penalty	A writ compelling testimony, the production of evidence, or some other action, under penalty for failure to do so.	
subpoena ad testificandum	under penalty to be witnessed	An order compelling an entity to give oral testimony in a legal matter.	
subpoena duces tecum	bring with you under penalty	An order compelling an entity to produce physical evidence or witness in a legal matter.	
suggestio falsi	false suggestion	A false statement made in the negotiation of a contract.	
sui generis	of its own kind/genus	Something that is unique amongst a group.	
sui juris	of his own right	Refers to one legally competent to manage his own affairs. Also spelled sui iuris.	
suo motu	of its own motion	Refers to a court or other official agency taking some action on its own accord (synonyms: ex proprio motu, ex mero motu). Similar to sua sponte.	
supersedeas	refrain from	A bond tendered by an appellant as surety to the court, requesting a delay of payment for awards or damages granted, pending the outcome of the appeal.	
suppressio veri	suppression of the truth	Willful concealment of the truth when bound to reveal it, such as withholding details of damage from an auto accident from a prospective buyer of the car in that accident.	
supra	above	Used in citations to refer to a previously cited source.	
terra nullius	no one's land	Land that has never been part of a sovereign state, or land which a sovereign state has relinquished claim to.	
trial de novo	trial anew	A completely new trial of a matter previously judged. It specifically refers to a replacement trial for the previous one, and not an appeal of the previous decision.	
trinoda necessitas	three-knotted need	Refers to a threefold tax levied on Anglo-Saxon citizens to cover roads, buildings, and the military.	
uberrima fides	most abundant faith	Concept in contract law specifying that all parties must act with the utmost good faith.	
ubi eadem ratio, ibi idem jus	where there is the same reason there is the same law; like reason doth make like law.	See the judgment of Lord Holt CJ in Ashby v White.	
ubi jus ibi remedium	wherever a right exists there is also a remedy	See the judgment of Lord Holt CJ in Ashby v White. Some legal scholars find it reflected in the Due Process Clause of the Fourteenth Amendment to the United States Constitution.	
ultra vires	beyond the powers	An act that requires legal authority to perform, but which is done without obtaining that authority.	
universitas personarum	totality of people	Aggregate of people, body corporate, as in a college, corporation, or state	
universitas rerum	totality of things	Aggregate of things.	
uno flatu	in one breath	Used to criticize inconsistencies in speech or testimony, as in: one says one thing, and in the same breath, says another contradictory thing.	
uti possidetis	as you possess	Ancient concept regarding conflicts, wherein all property possessed by the parties at the conclusion of the conflict shall remain owned by those parties unless treaties to the contrary are enacted.	
uxor	wife	Used in documents in place of the wife's name. Usually abbreviated et ux.	
vel non	or not	Used when considering whether some event or situation is either present or it is not.	
veto	forbid	The power of an executive to prevent an action, especially the enactment of legislation.	
vice versa	the other way around	Something that is the same either way.	
vide	see	Used in citations to refer the reader to another location.	
videlicet	contraction of videre licet, meaning "it is permitted to see"	Used in documents to mean "namely" or "that is". Usually abbreviated viz.	
viz.	abbreviation of videlicet	Namely.	
vigilantibus non dormientibus iura subveniunt	The laws benefit those who are vigilant rather than those who sleep.		

== Civil law ==
Term or phrase	Literal translation	Definition and use	English pron
accessio	something added	Accession, i.e. mode of acquisition by creation in which labor and other goods are added to property in such a manner that the identity of the original property is not lost (vs. commixtio, specificatio)	
accidentalia negotii	business incidentals	Ancillary terms and conditions; express contractual terms that are purely voluntary, optional, and not necessitated by the contract's subject matter. Also called incidentalia (Roman-Dutch law). One of three types of contractual terms, the others being essentialia negotii 'core terms' and naturalia negotii 'implied terms'.	
actus iuridicus	legal act	1. In French-law-based systems, refers only to those sources of subjective law that are human-made and voluntary (vs. factum iuridicum); 2. In German-law-based systems, encompasses all sources of subjective law, be they human-made or not, voluntary or not. See also negotium iuridicum.	
ad quantitatem	by the quantity	itemized, e.g. sale ad quantitatem = item sale (e.g. 100 carp, 10,000 lbs. of sugar, 10 casks of corn) (vs. per aversionem)	
aditio hereditatis	hereditary approach	Entering into the inheritance, i.e. vesting of the inheritance in an heir or will beneficiary. See delatio hereditatis.	
aliquid novi	something new	The new element or aspect of a novation (vs. idem debitum). Also known as novum.	
casum sentit dominus	accident is felt by the owner	The owner who has to assume the risk of accidental harm to him or accidental loss to his property.	
casus fortuitus	fortuitous event	Force majeure arising from a human-made inevitable accident (e.g. riots, strikes, civil war); ex: When H.M.S. Bounty was destroyed by Hurricane Sandy, October 29, 2012, casus fortuitus would describe the H.M.S. Bounty being at the wrong place when Hurricane Sandy came up the coast.HMS Bounty Sinks Compare vis maior (see below).	
cautio de restituendo	guarantee to reinstate	Security or guarantee that heirs must provide in a case where an absent person's estate is divided among them (insurance law)	
cessio	yielding	Assignment, that is, the transfer of rights or benefits. Parties: cedens 'cedent' (= assignor); cessionarius 'cessionary, cessionee' (= assignee); debitor cessus 'third-party obligor'; Types: cessio in anticipando - assignment of future right or benefit; cessio in securitatem debiti - assignment of a principal debt (right of action) as security for the due performance of another debt (the secured debt)	
collatio bonorum	bringing together of goods	Hotchpot. Also called collatio inter liberos (Scots law).	
commixtio	commingling	Confusion, i.e. acquisition by creation in which fungible solid or liquid goods (and no labor) of different owners intermingle in such a way that the mixture creates a new thing and can no longer be separately identified, it is owned by the owners in co-ownership (vs. accessio, specificatio)	
commodatum	accommodation	Loan for use, i.e. bailment of movable property that is not perishable or consumable to be returned without payment. Parties: commodans 'lender'; commodatarius 'borrower'	
communio bonorum	community of goods	The aggregate of marital property (or marital estate) under a community property matrimonial regime.	
compensatio	balancing of accounts	Set-off. Type: compensatio lucri cum damno - set-off of profit and loss	
compensatio morae	balance of delay	Delay in payment or performance on the part of both the debtor and the creditor.	
confusio	melting together	Merger of counterparty rights in the same person (e.g. debtor-creditor, buyer-seller, landlord-tenant, etc.), thereby extinguishing an obligation or right. Adverb: confusione.	
conjunctissimus	the most joined	Next-of-kin. Plural conjunctissimi.	
contra bonos mores	against good morals	Contracts so made are generally illegal and unenforceable.	
culpa	guilt	Unintentional negligence (in tort). Degrees: culpa lata - gross negligence; culpa levis - ordinary negligence; culpa levissima - slight negligence	
cum beneficio inventarii	under benefit of inventory	As in an heir cum beneficio inventarii, who accepts his/her share in a deceased's estate after having had an appraisal and estate inventory drawn up, thereby separating their share from the whole and limiting their liability.	
cum onere	with burdens	(Louisiana law) as encumbered, i.e. alienated with the encumbrances running with the land.	
cura	guardianship	Curatorship, i.e. legal guardianship under which the ward is totally and permanently incapable. Compare tutela. Parties are: curandus - ward; curator - guardian (see below)	
curator	guardian	Guardian under a curatorship (cura). Types are: curator ad litem - guardian ad litem; curator bonis - guardian of the property; curator personae - guardian of the person	
damnum emergens	emergent loss	Loss actually incurred because of a contractual breach	
damnum et interesse	damage and interests	Tortious damages, damages in tort	
data certa	certain date	Fixed effective date of a contract, i.e. one that cannot be ante- or post-dated	
datio in solutum	giving in payment	Species of accord and satisfaction by transfer or assignment of property in lieu of money; kind of in-kind payment, as opposed to a money payment	
de cujus	(s)he for whom...	The deceased, decedent. Short for de cujus successione agitur.	
delatio hereditatis	hereditary transferral	Falling open of succession. See aditio hereditatis.	
domicilium citandi et executandi	domicile for summoning and carrying out	Address for service or notices (e.g. for contractual purposes).	
dominium plurium in solidum	plural, joint and several ownership	Joint tenancy.	
dominium pro parte pro indiviso	unpartitioned and undivided ownership	Tenancy in common. The types are: communio pro indiviso (aka communio pro partibus indivisis) - bound common ownership: co-ownership arising from an underlying legal relationship; all parties must agree to partition or terminate; communio incidens - arising by operation of law, e.g. indivision (succession), party walls, common areas of a condominium; communio voluntaria - arising by voluntary act, e.g. marital estate (community property), company/partnership property; communio pro diviso - free common ownership: the only legal relationship which exists between the parties is the co-ownership; unilaterally partitionable and terminable	
dominus litis	master of the case	Litigant, the client in a lawsuit, as opposed to the lawyer.	
error in iudicando	error in judgment (in court)	Error of fact and reasoning (vs. error in procedendo)	
error in procedendo	procedural error (in court)	Error on a point of law or procedure (vs. error in iudicando)	
essentialia negotii	business essentials	Express or implied contractual terms that are required either by law or by the contract's subject matter. One of three types of contractual terms, the others being accidentialia negotii and naturalia negotii.	
ex intervalo temporis		Not all at once, in parts (vs. uno contextu).	
ex propriis sensibus	with one's own senses	Used for firsthand testimony, e.g. testimony ex propriis sensibus (vs. per relationem).	
factum iuridicum	legal fact	In French-law-based systems, refers to those sources of subjective law that are either not human-made or human-made but involuntary (vs. actus iuridicus).	
falsus procurator	fake agent	Agent de son tort, officious agent	
fideicommissum	entrusting to (a person's) good faith.	Testamentary trust; a form of substitution (called 'fideicommissary substitution') in which a will beneficiary is instructed in the will to transfer the testamentary gift in whole or part to a third party. A fideicommissum is created either expressly in a will or impliedly through a si sine liberis decesserit clause or through a prohibition against alienation in the will. Parties: fideicommittens 'grantor' (= testator); fiduciarius 'fiduciary' (= trustee); fideicommissarius 'fideicommissary' (= beneficiary); Types: fideicommissum simplex - one 'gift-over' to single beneficiary; fideicommissum multiplex - multiple gift-overs to a succession of beneficiaries; fideicommissum residui - fiduciary can alienate 3/4 of assets	
fideiussio		Suretyship.	
fructus industriales	industrial fruits	Emblements; in property law, a co-owner profiting from her or his fructus industriales is solely responsible for any losses that my occur. (vs. fructus naturales, see below).	
fructus naturales	natural fruits	Vegetation naturally growing from old roots (as pasturage) or from trees (as timber or fruit) (vs. fructus industriales, see above).	
hereditas iacens	lying inheritance	Estate of inheritance before vesting in heirs	
heres		Heir. Plural heredes. Types: heredes proximi - next-of-kin (aka conjunctissimi); heredes remotiores - all other heirs; sui heredes necessarii - forced heirs (singular suus heres necessarius)	
hypotheca		Mortgage	
idem debitum	same debt	The element or aspect of the novation that does not change (vs. aliquid novi)	
in casu	in the case	In the instant case; used when referring to the matter before the court in a case being discussed	
in solidum	for the whole	Jointly and severally; short for singuli et in solidum. Where a group of persons share liability for a debt, such as co-signers to a loan, the debtor can sue a single party in solidum, that is jointly and severally, to recover the entire amount owed.	
inaedificatio	building	Attachment of movables to land, accession by building	
inaudita altera parte	without hearing the other party	Equivalent of common law ex parte, especially in the context of submitting a motion, brief, or obtaining relief as fast as possible	
incapax	incapable	(Scots law) person not having capacity (mental, legal, or otherwise).	[ɪnˈkapaks]
indignus (heres)	unworthy heir	Unworthy beneficiary or heir, who is precluded from inheriting because his conduct makes him unworthy, in a legal sense, to take in the deceased's estate.	
infans	infant	(Roman-Dutch law) child of 7 years or younger and who therefore has very limited legal capacity. Plural infantes.	[ˈinˌfanz]
invecta et illata	brought in and carried out	Tenant's things brought into the leased premises for his/her temporary use	
iudex ad quem		Appellate court or court of last resort (vs. iudex a quo)	
iudex a quo		Lower court from which an appeal originates; originating court (vs. iudex ad quem)	
iura novit curia	the court knows the law	The principle that the parties to a legal dispute do not need to plead or prove the law that applies to their case.	
ius accrescendi	right of accrual	(Civil law) Accretion, i.e. right of a will beneficiary to succeed proportionately to a testamentary gift that another beneficiary in the same will cannot or does not want to take.	
ius commune	common law	Not actually referring to common law; this term refers to common doctrine and principles of civil law that underlie all aspects of civilian legal systems and that formed the basis of medieval Roman law.	
ius persequendi	right of following	Right of pursuit, i.e. the creditor's right to pursue a debt that runs with the land into the hands of a bona fide purchaser	
ius praeferendi	right of preferring	Priority right or preferential right, i.e. a creditor's right to rank higher relative to another	
ius quaesitum tertio	right to third-party relief	Right of a third-party beneficiary to sue in order to enforce a third-party contract, i.e. the opposite of privity of contract.	
ius retentionis	right of retaining	Lien (possessory)	
ius variandi	right of varying	Free choice of court actions where concurrent actions lie, e.g. tort and criminal, or tort and breach of contract.	
laesio enormis	unusual injury	Lesion, i.e. excessive loss or injury used as grounds for setting aside a contract. Lesion beyond moiety (laesio ultra dimidium) is the standard in French-law-based systems; sold for less than half its value or purchased for more than double.	
lex commissoria	cancelling law	Forfeiture clause for nonperformance of a contract, especially (1) a provision that a pledge shall be forfeited if a loan is defaulted, or (2) a condition that money paid on a contract of sale shall be forfeited and the sale rescinded if outstanding payments are defaulted. Also known as a pactum commissorium.	
liberandi causa	liberating cause	As in 'prescription liberandi causa', i.e. liberative prescription (aka extinctive prescription), which is the civilian equivalent of a statutory limitation period.	
locatio conductio	leasing (and) hiring	Hire or rental. Types: locatio conductio operarum - employment, indentured servitude, and master/slave relationship; locatio conductio operis - hire of service provider or independent contractor; locatio conductio rei - rental or letting of property	
lucrum cessans	ceasing profit	Prospective damages or loss of profits that would, because of the contractual breach, have been made in the future	
mandatum	mandate	Bilateral agreement for direct representation between a principal and agent. Compare procuratio. Parties: mandatarius 'agent'; mandator 'principal'	
monstrum	monster	Child born with severe deformities. Plural monstra.	
mora accipiendi	delay of the one receiving	Delay in payment or performance on the part of the creditor or obligor. Also known as mora creditoris.	
mora solvendi	delay of the one paying	Delay in payment or performance on the part of the debtor or the obligee. Also known as mora debitoris. 2 forms: mora solvendi ex re - delay in giving or delivering a thing; mora solvendi ex personae - delay in obligations to do or perform personal service.	
mutuum	loan	Loan for consumption, i.e. bailment of fungible movable property that is to be returned in kind in the same quantity and quality. Parties: mutuum dans (aka mutuans) 'lender'; mutuum accipiens (aka mutuarius) 'borrower'	
naturalia negotii	business naturals	Express or implied contractual terms that go to the root of a contract's subject matter. One of three types of contractual terms, the others being accidentialia negotii and essentalia negotii.	
nec vi, nec clam, nec precario	Without force, without secrecy, without permission	Peacefully, openly, and with the intention to acquire ownership; applies to acquisitive prescription	
negotiorum gestio	management of affairs	Quasi-contractual obligation arising from benevolent or necessitous intermeddling, obliging the benefited party (dominus negotii) to reimburse the intermeddler (gestor) for the cost that was used in doing good works.	
negotium iuridicum	legal business	1. In French-law-based systems, refers to the legal operation, activity, or fact embodied or memorialized by a legal instrument (as opposed to the instrument itself, known as an instrumentum); 2. In German-law-based systems, refers to a transactional act, the main sub-type of legal acts. See also actus iuridicus.	
non bis in idem	not twice in the same	Prohibition against double jeopardy. A legal action cannot be brought twice for the same act or offense.	[nɔnbisinidɛm]
novum iudicium	new judgment	Appeal by way of hearing de novo, i.e. the case is retried with no restrictions of scope: errors of law are reviewed and new findings of fact are made. (vs. revisio prioris instantiae)	
nudum praeceptum	naked precept	If a testator places a prohibition on a testamentary gift but fails to say what should happen to the gift if the prohibition is contravened, the prohibition is said to be 'nude', i.e. a nudum praeceptum. In other words, the prohibition is of no effect, and the beneficiary will take the gift free from any restrictions.	
pactum de contrahendo	agreement to contract	Prior contract aimed at concluding another contract, known as the parent or principal contract. Includes binders (in real estate sales), such as a purchase offer or an option to sell.	
pactum de non cedendo	agreement to not yield	Anti-assignment clause	
pactum de non petendo (in anticipando)	agreement to not sue	Agreement in which one party agrees not to sue the other.	
pactum de retrovendendo	agreement to sell back	Contract of sale with right of repurchase	
pactum reservati dominii	agreement of reserved owners	Reservation of title	
pactum successorium	inheritance agreement	Bilateral contract concerning succession, usually made between a potential testator (future decedent) and his/her heir. Plural pacta successoria. The most common forms are: pactum renunciativum (aka pactum de non succedendo) - (contractual) disclaimer of interest; pactum acquisitivum (aka pactum conservandae successionis) - (contractual) deed of variation; pactum de hereditate tertii viventis - family settlement agreement (aka deed of family arrangement).	
pars dominii	ownership part	The major interests in the bundle of rights making up ownership. In French-based systems there are three, being usus (aka ius utendi), fructus (aka ius fruendi), and abusus (aka ius abutendi). In German-based systems there are more, usually ius possidendi ‘owner’s right to possess’, ius utendi fruendi ‘right of use and enjoyment’, ius abutendi ‘right to consume’, ius disponendi ‘right of disposal’, ius prohibendi ‘right of exclusion’, and ius vindicandi ‘right to recover or reclaim’.	
paterfamilias	father of the family	The head of household, for purposes of considering the rights and responsibilities thereof. (Civil law) bonus paterfamilias: a standard of care equivalent to the common law ordinary reasonable man. Other degrees of care are: diligens paterfamilias - higher standard of care, greater diligence; diligentissimus paterfamilias - highest standard of care, utmost diligence.	
penitus extraneus	outside penitent	Incidental beneficiary or any outside party to a third-party contract (see stipulatio alteri). Plural penitus extranei.	
per aversionem	by turning away	(1) description, whereby the surrounding property is used to provide the legal description of the boundaries of the property; (2) sale per aversionem = bulk sale (a flock of sheep for $100 - the number of sheep are uncounted) (vs. ad quantitatum)	
per relationem	by relation	Hearsay; used for secondhand, indirect evidence, e.g. testimony per relationem 'hearsay testimony' (vs. ex propriis sensibus). Also called de auditu.	
pignus	pledge	Pledge, i.e. a possessory security interest	
pleno iure	by full right	Self-executing, without need of a court order or judicial proceedings; with full right or authority. Ex: null pleno iure.	
plus quam tolerabile	more than tolerable	Excessive, intolerable; in reference to a nuisance or some other violation of neighbor law.	
praedium	estate	Landed property, tenement of land, especially with respect to an easement (servitude). 2 types: praedium dominans - dominant estate (aka dominant tenement); praedium serviens - servient estate (aka servient tenement)	
praeemptio	previous purchase	Right of first refusal	
praesumptio	presumption	Legal presumption. Types: praesumptio iuris tantum - rebuttable presumption; praesumptio iuris et de iure - irrebuttable or conclusive presumption	
praesumptio innocentiae		Presumption of innocence	
praesumptio veritatis et solemnitatis	presumption of truth and solemnity	Presumption of regularity, which attaches to public instruments admissible to prove the truth of their contents.	
pretium doloris	price for pain	Solatium, i.e. damages for pain and suffering. Also known in German-based jurisdictions as pretium pro doloribus.	
prior tempore potior iure	earlier in time, stronger in law	(Scots law, civil law), usually translated as "prior in time, superior in right", the principle that someone who registers (a security interest) earlier therefore ranks higher than other creditors.	
probatio		Evidence (admissible in a court of law), especially documentary evidence. Types: adminiculum (probationis) 'adminicular evidence' - evidence adduced in aid or support of other evidence, which without it is imperfect; semiplena probatio, probatio semiplena 'half proof, imperfect proof' - executed in presence of 1 or no witnesses; includes private instruments; plena probatio, probatio plena 'full proof, perfect proof' - executed in presence of 2 witnesses; includes public instruments; probatio probatissima - the highest evidence, referring to testimony under oath (received into common law but not civil law)	
procuratio	management	Power of attorney, i.e. a unilateral grant of indirect representation by a principal to an attorney-in-fact. Compare mandatum.	
procurator		Agent, attorney-in-fact. Types: procurator ad causas - attorney employed to assist a litigant in the conduct of his lawsuit; procurator ad negotia - attorney assisting his client in transacting other business; procurator in rem suam - holder of an irrevocable power of attorney	
quaestus liberales		Liberal profession	
restitutio in integrum	total reinstatement	(1) Restoration of something, such as a building or damaged property, to its original condition. (2) In contract law, when considering breach of contract and remedies, to restore a party to an original position.	
revisio prioris instantiae	review of the court below	Appeal by way of re-hearing or pure appeal (aka appeal stricto sensu); the scope is limited to errors of law and no new factual findings are possible; the case is traditionally remitted to the originating court below for re-judgment. (vs. novum iudicium)	
salva rei substantia	the thing's substance intact	Limitation on how a fiduciary can use the fideicommissary assets; ultimately they must maintain their essential quality until transferred to the fideicommissary. Plural salva rerum substantia. See fideicommissum.	
servitus	servitude, subjugation	Servitude, i.e. an easement. Plural servitutes. Types: servitus personarum 'personal servitude' (≈ easement in gross); servitus praediorum 'praedial servitude' (≈ easement appertunant); Sub-types: servitus itineris - ingress/egress easement; servitus ne luminibus officiatur - right to light (aka solar easement); servitus non altius tollendi - restricts building beyond a certain height; servitus oneris ferendi - duty to keep an adjoining wall in good repair; servitus tigni immittendi - right of inserting beams in a neighbor's walls; servitus viae - right-of-way	
si sine liberis decesserit	if (he) should depart without children	Certain type of clause in a will creating a fideicommissum by imposing a condition on the will beneficiary that if (s)he dies childless, the testamentary gift will transfer to a third party. Ex: If A dies childless after my death, the farm must go to B. See fideicommissum.	
solarium	area exposed to sunlight	Ground rent for a surface right or estate (superficies).	
solutio indebiti, indebiti solutio	performance of something not due	Undue performance or payment, obliging the enrichee (accipiens) to return the undue payment or compensate the impoverishee (solvens) for the undue performance	
specificatio		Specification, i.e. mode of acquisition by creation wherein something new is made by adding labor (manufacturing) to property, and the non-reducible parts used for its fabrication lose their identity (vs. accessio, commixtio). The new thing is called nova species.	
spei emptio, emptio spei	sale of hope	Sale of a chance, hope, or expectancy	
spes futurae actionis	hope of future action	Future or contingent right of action	
spes successionis	hope of succession	Expectancy (of heirship)	
spoliatio	plundering	Spoliation, i.e. act of unlawful dispossession of corporeal property. Parties: spoliatus - aggrieved party; spoliator - dispossessor	
stante matrimonio		During the marriage	
stipulatio alteri	another's (contractual) provision	Third-party contract. Also known as pactum in favorem tertii (German-law-based systems). The parties are: promittens 'promisor'; stipulans 'promisee'; alteri (aka tertius) 'third-party beneficiary'	
superficies	surface	Surface right, surface estate. Parties: dominus soli 'subsurface owner, mineral owner'; superficiarius 'surface owner'	
tantum et tale	thus and such	(Scots law) "as is", to disclaim implied warranties, as in to purchase or convey something tantum et tale.	
transactio	transaction	Out-of-court settlement	
tutela	guardianship	Tutorship, i.e. legal guardianship under which the ward is only partially or temporarily incapable. Compare cura. Parties are: pupillus - ward; tutor - guardian	
Unus testis, nullus testis	one witness, no witness	The uncorroborated testimony of one witness should be discounted because it is deemed to be too unreliable to establish a fact	
uno contextu	single joining together	Contemporaneously; when the phases of something are done without interruption or any intervening action; specifically, executed in one single execution ceremony (vs. ex intervalo temporis)	
usucapio	seizure of use	Acquisitive prescription, i.e. the civilian equivalent of adverse possession. Also called 'prescription acquirendi causa'.	
usufructus	use-fruit	Civilian equivalent of a life estate. Parties: nudus dominus 'bare owner' (≈ remainderman, reversioner); usufructuarius 'usufructuary' (≈ life tenant)	
venire contra factum proprium (non potest)	is not allowed going back against own former actions	Estoppel by representation as under the law merchant	
via executoria	executorial way	Non-judicial foreclosure under a power of sale clause in a mortgage; more broadly, any non-judicial remedy empowered under a contractual clause or some other instrument	
via iure	way of law	Using the courts and the justice system (opposite of self-help)	
vinculum iuris	the chain of the law	A legal bond, especially the bond tying obligor and obligee in a legal obligation	
vis maior	superior force	Force majeure arising from an act of God, i.e. events over which humans have no control, and so cannot be held liable. Compare casus fortuitus (see above).	
vitium in contrahendo	vice in contracting	Vitiating factor in the formation of a contract, e.g. mistake (error), misrepresentation (dolus), and duress (metus).	
voluntatis declaratio		Declaration of will, manifestation of intent(ion)	

== Ecclesiastical law ==
Term or phrase	Definition and use
advocatus diaboli	Official who argues against an individual's beatification
de iure quaesito non tollendo	A principle referred to in papal documents such as Pope Gregory XVI's Benedictus Deus, 1834, and Pope Pius X's Quae rei, 1908.
ebdomadarius	Person in a cathedral who supervises regular performance of religious services and assigns duties of choir members
eleemosynae	Possessions of the church
embryo formatus	Human embryo "organized into human shape and endowed with a soul"
embryo informatus	Human embryo before endowment with a soul
episcoporum ecidicus	church lawyer
episcopus puerorum	"bishop of the boys"; a layperson who on some feastdays braided his hair, dressed as a bishop and acted in a "ludicrous" manner
excommunicato capiendo	Writ originally issued from chancery that required a sheriff to arrest and imprison an excommunicant defendant
excommunicato recapiendo	Writ ordering excommunicant imprisoned for "obstinancy" be re-imprisoned if freed before agreeing to obey authority of church
Extravagantes	Papal constitutions and decretal epistles of Pope John XXII
formata	Canonical letters
gardianus ecclesiae	Churchwarden
legit vel non	"Does he read or not?"; this question was asked to church officials by secular courts when an accused defendant claimed a jurisdictional exemption under benefit of the clergy and if the church accepted the claim the official would reply legit ut clericus ("he reads like a clerk")

== See also ==
- Brocard (law)
- Byzantine law
- Code of Hammurabi
- Corpus Juris Canonici
- International Roman Law Moot Court
- Law French
- Latin tag
- List of Latin abbreviations
- List of Latin phrases (full)
- List of fallacies
- List of Philippine legal terms
- List of Roman laws
- Twelve Tables
