= Williams v Hensman =

English trusts law case

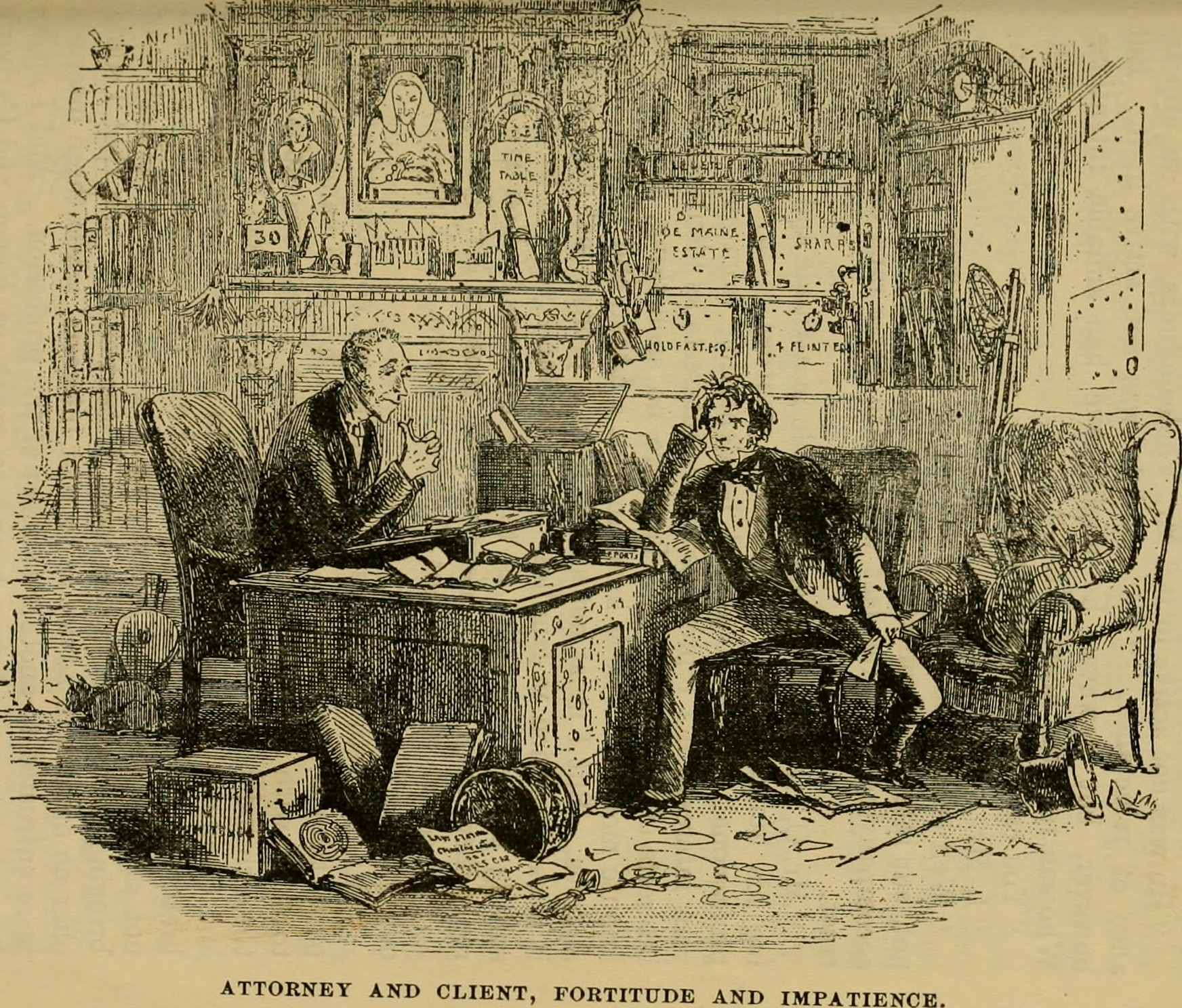
- Court: Court of Chancery
- Citation: (1861) 1 J&H 546

Case history
- Subsequent action: none

Court membership
- Judges sitting: Page Wood, Vice-Chancellor

Case opinions
- Held: A joint-tenancy may be severed in three ways...

Keywords
- Co-ownership

Williams v Hensman (1861) is an English trusts law case.

Its principles of co-owned interests are today more relevant to land, whether from a trust now held as joint tenants (the default form) or as tenants in common (which follows on from express words such as "in equal shares" or from severance); in law all co-owned land in England and Wales must be held in either form.

It sets out the three means of severance.

== Facts ==
Money was bequeathed to be invested in stock, and to pay an annuity to A, with the ‘principal (Note: this is a synonym for all the capital, i.e. excluding any interest/dividends/rents earned unless undistributed) to go to her children at death.’ All eight children consented to money being invested in a mortgage fund. Three were minors. They could not end the trust until they all grew up under the rule in Saunders v Vautier. The trustee, with full agreement, advanced a sum to one of the children, and the other children covenanted: not to call upon the trustee to make up any deficiency (to them) in case the shares held for them ("the share") should fall short of the advance (made to the other child), and also to indemnify the trustee against all claim(s), damage and expenses by reason of the advance.

The question was whether the beneficiaries of the trust was still co-owned jointly tenancy.

== Judgment ==
The Chancery Court held it was a joint tenancy. And the act of the five severed their interest from the other three. Page-Wood VC decided:.

A joint-tenancy may be severed in three ways:

in the first place, an act of any one of the persons interested operating upon his own share may create a severance as to that share. The right of each joint-tenant is a right by survivorship only in the event of no severance having taken place of the share which is claimed under the jus accrescendi [law of accruing to the survivor, right of survivorship]. Each one is at liberty to dispose of his own interest in such manner as to sever it from the joint fund—losing, of course, at the same time, his own right of survivorship.

Secondly, a joint-tenancy may be severed by mutual agreement.

And, in the third place, there may be a severance by any course of dealing sufficient to intimate that the interests of all were mutually treated as constituting a tenancy in common. When the severance depends on an inference of this kind without any express act of severance, it will not suffice to rely on an intention, with respect to the particular share, declared only behind the backs of the other persons interested. You must find in this class of cases a course of dealing by which the shares of all the parties to the contest have been effected, as happened in the cases of Wilson v Bell and Jackson v Jackson.

== Applied in ==
Barton v Morris [1985] 1 WLR 1257; [1985] 2 All ER 1032, EWHC Ch D

== Considered in ==
Harris v Goddard [1983] 1 WLR 1203; [1983] 3 All ER 242, EWCA

== See also ==
- English trusts law
- English land law
- English property law
