= Re Dennis =

English land law case

- Their interests became severed on the act of bankruptcy, not the order for bankruptcy
- Citation: [1996] Ch 80

Case history
- Subsequent action: none

Case opinions
- Held: The interests of joint tenants are severed on the act of bankruptcy, not the order for bankruptcy

Keywords
- Co-ownership; act of bankruptcy; whether severs joint tenancy; tenant-in-common (passing of share in property under Will not survivorship)

Re Dennis [1996] Ch 80 is an English land law case, concerning co-ownership of land.

== Facts ==
Mr and Mrs Dennis were joint tenants. He failed to comply with a bankruptcy notice, an act of bankruptcy. Then his wife died. Then he was declared bankrupt. There was no secured lending affecting their house (mortgage) to which the wife had assented. The question in law was whether the act of bankruptcy terminated (severed) the joint tenancy between the couple; if so then the husband's trustees would not receive automatically the wife's share, instead her Will would be free to allocate the property as she saw fit (or if she had died intestate, the Intestacy Rules would prevail).

== Judgment ==
Held, under the Bankruptcy Act 1914, severance occurred at the date of the act of bankruptcy, so on her death the wife was a tenant in common with a half share and that passed to their children. Had a joint tenancy continued then the bankrupt's trustees would have acquired her share to consider in accordance with the bankruptcy rules.

== See also ==
- English trusts law (Concurrent estate)
- English land law
