= No contest (disambiguation) =

No contest, or nolo contendere, is a plea in a criminal court case.

No contest may also refer to:

- No-contest clause, a legal clause in some documents that is intended to discourage a party from contesting their validity
- No contest (sports), a match that ends without a winner or loser
- No Contest (film), a film starring Shannon Tweed
- "No Contest", an episode from the first season of Cheers
