= Ipso jure =

Latin phrase meaning "by the law itself"

Ipso jure is a Latin phrase, directly translated as "by the law itself". It is used as an adverb.

== Usage ==
The phrase is used to describe legal consequences that occur by the act of the law itself. For example, if property is held in a tenancy by the entirety by a husband and wife, who then get divorced, the property is converted ipso jure (i.e. by the law itself) into another form of tenancy, usually a tenancy in common, at the very instant the marriage is dissolved. Likewise, contracts that establish partnerships sometimes provide that the partnership is ipso jure dissolved if one partner attempts to sell his or her interest in the partnership. In all of these situations, when one legally significant fact occurs, other relationships are automatically changed by the law.

== See also ==
- Latae sententiae
- List of Latin phrases
- Operation of law
