= Demise =

Death, or transfer of an estate

Demise is an Anglo-Norman legal term (from French démettre, from Latin dimittere, to send away) for the transfer of an estate, especially by lease. It has an operative effect in a lease, implying a covenant "for quiet enjoyment".

The phrase "demise of the Crown" is used in English law to signify the immediate transfer of the sovereignty, with all its attributes and prerogatives, to the successor without any interregnum in accordance with the maxim "the Crown never dies". At common law the death of the sovereign de facto dissolved Parliament, but this was abolished by the Representation of the People Act 1867. Similarly the common law doctrine that all offices held under the Crown were terminated at its demise has been abolished by the Demise of the Crown Act 1901.

== Etymology ==
The English word "demise" comes from the Latin word "demissio" (see, e.g., ex demissione), which comes from Latin "demittere", which is a compound of de + mittere, meaning "to send from".
