= Nudum pactum =

In law, an unenforceable promise

Nudum pactum in Latin literally means 'naked promise' or 'bare promise'. In common law, it refers to a promise that is not legally enforceable for want of consideration. An example of a nudum pactum would be an offer to sell something without a corresponding offer of value in exchange. While the offer may bind a person morally, since the offer has not been created with any consideration, it is gratuitous and treated as a unilateral contract. The offer is therefore revocable at any time by the offeror before acceptance by the offeree.

In the US, the Uniform Commercial Code has invalidated the doctrine of nudum pactum as it applies to offers made by "merchants" under the firm offer rule under certain circumstances. It holds that those offers are legally enforceable in a manner similar to option contracts.

== See also ==
- Contract
- Gentlemen's agreement
- Option contract
- List of Latin legal terms
