= Ex nunc =

Ex nunc is a Latin phrase meaning from now on. It is used as a legal term to signify that something is valid only for the future and not the past. The opposite is ex tunc.

== See also ==
- List of legal Latin terms
