= Pierringer release =

Type of settlement agreement

A Pierringer release or Pierringer Agreement is a type of settlement agreement. In law, a settlement is a resolution between disputing parties about a legal case that is reached either before or after court action begins.

The origin of the case is the Wisconsin tort law case of Pierringer v. Hoger.

== Features ==
A Pierringer Release has the following features:

- the settling defendant’s liability is segregated
- the satisfaction of the settling defendant’s liability to the credit of all parties to the litigation
- the plaintiff’s ability to continue with the action against the remaining defendants
- the plaintiff’s agreement that it will indemnify the settling defendant for any contribution sought from it by the non-settling defendant(s).

== Sources ==
- Peter B. Knapp, "Keeping the Pierringer Promise: Fair Settlements and Fair Trials," 20 William Mitchell Law Review 1 (1994)
