= Ius civile vigilantibus scriptum est =

Latin legal maxim

Ius civile vigilantibus scriptum est is a Latin legal phrase that translates to "civil law is written for the vigilant". It can be traced back to the Roman jurist Quintus Cervidius Scaevola (2nd century AD) and is to this day referred to in different legal systems and contexts. Many variations of the brocard are known all connoting similar but slightly different concepts.

== Meaning and variants ==
In its original form, the adage means that private law is written for those persons who are vigilant in pursuing their interests and diligently care for their own affairs.

Many variants of it are known: In American and Australian law vigilantibus non dormientibus aequitas subvenit is used and introduced as a principle of equity (aequitas). In this variation the principle translates to "[e]quity assists the vigilant, not those who sleep upon their rights". A similar variant – leges vigilantibus non dormientibus subserviunt – is known in public international law and means that "[t]he laws serve those who are vigilant, not those who are sleeping." The adage here relates to the equity doctrine of laches and connotes that a claimant who unreasonably delays the bringing of their claim may lose it if the delay unfairly prejudices the respondent. Another common variation is vigilantibus non dormientibus subvenit lex meaning that "[t]he law supports the waking, not the sleeping." This iteration of the maxim emphasizes that claimants should not sleep on their claims but diligently enforce them in a timely manner. Aaron X. Fellmeth and Maurice Horwitz point out that "subvenit lex" is from time-to-time substituted by "subveniunt leges", "serviunt leges", "subveniunt iura" or "succurrit lex" without a change in the meaning.

== History ==
The adage can be traced back to the Roman jurist Quintus Cervidius Scaevola, who lived in the 2nd century AD and was praefectus vigilum during the reign of Marcus Aurelius. He used it in his liber singularis quaestionum publice tractatarum, a volume on publicly debated legal issues. It has been codified in the Digests of Justinian as D. 42.8.24, title D. 42.8 dealing with malicious transactions to third parties with the intention to reduce a debtor's estate.

The codified fragment in its second part concerns a case in the field of creditor protection law. It more specifically notes that a claim collected by a single (vigilant) creditor shortly before the opening of bankruptcy proceedings (missio in bona) should stay in place and not be subject to an actio Pauliana. The remaining (less vigilant) creditors should only be able to satisfy themselves from the remaining (reduced) assets of the debtor. The ratio decidendi may be seen in the consideration that those who act diligently in their own affairs and make a debtor pay before the onset of insolvency proceedings are not acting unlawfully in relation to their co-creditors.

In this fragment in the Digests the phrase ius civile vigilantibus scriptum est is laid down for the first time. D. 42.8.24 reads:

(Scaevola l.S. quaest. publ. tract.)
Pupillus patri heres extitit et uni creditorum solvit: mox abstinuit hereditate paterna: bona patris veneunt: an id quod accepit creditor revocandum sit, ne melioris condicionis sit quam ceteri creditores? an distinguimus, per gratificationem acceperit an non, ut, si per gratificationem tutorum, revocetur ad eandem portionem, quam ceteri creditores fuerint laturi: sin vero iuste exegerit, ceteri creditores neglexerint exactionem, interea res deterior facta sit, vel mortalitate vel subductis rebus mobilibus vel rebus soli ad irritum perductis, id quod acceperit creditor revocari nullo pacto potest, quoniam alii creditores suae neglegentiae expensum ferre debeant. quid ergo, si, cum in eo essent, ut bona debitoris mei venirent, solverit mihi pecuniam, an actione revocari ea possit a me? an distinguendum est, is optulerit mihi an ego illi extorserim invito et ^ ,ut^ si extorserim invito, revocetur, si non extorseim, non revocetur? sed vigilavi, meliorem meam condicionem feci, ius civile vigilantibus scriptum est: ideoque non revocatur id quod percepi.

SCAEVOLA, Questions Publicly Discussed, sole book: A pupillus succeeded his father as heir and paid one of the creditors; he then renounced his father's estate which accordinF.3dgly was sold. Should what the creditor received be reclaimed so that his position might be no better than that of the other creditors? We have to distinguish according as it was received by way of favoring or preference or not; if it was done as a preference or favor by the tutors, reclamation will be made to the same proportion to which the other creditors would be entitled; but if the creditor made a fair claim and the other creditors were remiss in pressing their claims and the whole matter has meanwhile deteriorated through the death of living assets, the removal of movable ones or the reduction to nothing of immovable assets, what the creditor received is in no way recoverable, since the other creditors must bear the consequences of their own negligence. Now what if, circumstances being such that my debtor's estate falls to be sold, he pays me the money due to me; can that money be claimed from me? Again, a distinction must be taken: Did he choose to pay me, or did I exact the money from an unwilling debtor with the result that in the latter case, a claim would be possible but not in the former case? I was looking after my own interests and so improved my position and the civil law is designed for those who look after themselves; accordingly, there will be no claim for what I received.

— D. 42.8.24. English translation by Alan Watson.

== Modern usage ==
The adage is to this day used by courts in many different jurisdictions, including civil and common law courts. It has, for example, been used in American, European, German and Lesothan courts:

=== Usage in the European Union ===
A variation of the brocard has been used in opinions of advocates general of the Court of Justice of the European Union. For example, in 1973, Alberto Trabucchi wrote:

This difference of treatment is not discrimination, but is merely the consistent application of the ancient and still valid maxim "vigilantibus, non dormientibus, iura succurrunt".

— Alberto Trabucchi, Opinion of Mr Advocate General Trabucchi delivered on 13 December 1973 (ECLI:EU:C:1973:164)

Niilo Jääskinen used a similar variant in a 2011 opinion:

At the outset, I note that these cases call to mind two maxims that are well known in all legal systems: first, the fact that rights come to those who are vigilant, not to those who sleep (iura vigilantibus, non dormientibus prosunt) and, secondly, that no one can make a claim based on his own wrongdoing (nemo auditur propriam turpitudinem allegans).

— Niilo Jääskinen, Opinion of Advocate General Jääskinen delivered on 26 May 2011 (ECLI:EU:C:2011:350)

=== Usage by American courts ===
Circuit judge Paul V. Niemeyer used yet another variation of the adage in a footnote to a 2001 opinion of the United States Court of Appeals for the Fourth Circuit (243 F.3d 789) and linked it with the common law doctrine of laches:

The doctrine of laches is based on the maxim that equity aids the vigilant, not those who sleep on their rights. Vigilantibus non dormientibus aequitas subvenit. But also note, aequitas ignorantiae opitulatur, oscitantiae non item (equity assists ignorance, but not carelessness).

— Paul V. Niemeyer, Lyons Partnership, L.P. v. Morris Costumes (243 F.3d 789)

=== Usage by German courts ===
In 2015, the German Landgericht Nürnberg-Fürth applied the principle and argued that it was a fundamental part of German private law.

Für jeden Anspruchsteller gilt der das Zivilrecht prägende Grundsatz: Das Zivilrecht ist für die Wachsamen geschrieben (ius civilis vigilantibus scriptum est). Es besteht vorliegend keine Veranlassung zu einer abweichenden Bewertung.

For every claimant this principle that characterises civil law applies: civil law is written for the vigilant (ius civilis vigilantibus scriptum est). There is no reason for a different assessment in this case.

— Landgericht Nürnberg-Fürth, Judgment of 30 September 2015 – 6 O 488/07 (openJur 2015, 18381)

=== Usage by Lesotho courts ===
In a 2006 opinion of the Labour Court of Lesotho ([2006] LSLC 7) the adage was also put to use:

A man whose allegedly legal interests are threatened should be vigilant in protecting them. He is not entitled to expect others particularly not the party threatening the disputed interest to protect him. Vigilantibus non dormientibus jura subveniunt may not be a rule of law, but it seems to be a maxim having some application in this instance.

— Labour Court of Lesotho, Rangoanana v Lesotho Standard Bank Ltd (LC/41/05, LC/33/97, LC/18/98)

=== Literary use ===
The brocard has been used by Walter Benjamin in his work Toward the Critique of Violence.
