= Periculum in mora =

Periculum in mora, Latin for "danger in delay", in Italian law and other civil law systems, is one of two conditions which must be asserted in actions aimed at obtaining a protective order or injunction, the other condition being fumus boni iuris, corresponding to the common law concept of a Prima facie case. The burden of proof of danger in delay falls to the person who requests the injunction or order, demonstrating the existence of both requirements, pericolum notice, and the risk of suffering serious and irreparable damage.

The term 'serious harm' refers to the magnitude of the damages, calculated in relation to the value of the property in dispute: an injury will not be so serious in itself, but only when compared to the object of contention. Irreparable damage is in the possibility of a remedy in the future against which the party seeking the injunction believes they will suffer. Only asset orientation is currently supported, in that the prevailing possibility of obtaining compensation for damages is, in itself, sufficient to prevent the founding of irreparable harm.

"Periculum in mora. Dépêchez-vous" ("Danger in delay. Hurry up.") is the "famous and much-quoted telegram" that Albrecht von Roon sent to Otto von Bismarck on September 18, 1862, to advise Bismarck to return from France to Berlin during the constitutional crisis that ended up raising Bismarck to power in the Prussian government.

== See also ==
- List of legal Latin terms
