= Fumus boni iuris =

Latin legal phrase

Fumus boni iuris is a Latin phrase, used in European and South American courts, meaning "likelihood of success on the merit of the case" (literal meaning: "smoke of a good right").

It is a requirement for receiving certain benefits (for example, legal aid) or pronunciation of certain court actions (for example, so-called protective measures, injunctions). It has a prima facie case when there is a possibility that the right claimed exists in practice: the existence of this assumption should be examined by the court which will decide according to the results of the fait accompli.

== Example and application ==
For example, when legal aid is sought, courts must examine whether the applicant has "proper right" thereto; if the claim the applicant founds their petition on in court is not unreasonable or reckless. When seizure is requested, the court must consider whether there are any facts that suggest the existence of a right to credit.

Also, in Italy, fumus boni iuris is one of the two necessary conditions to obtain an interlocutory injunction in a civil suit (under article 700 of the Code of Civil Procedure) or in an administrative suit (under article 55 of the Legislative Decree no. 104 of 2010). The other condition is the so-called periculum in mora, (or "danger in the delay").

== See also ==
- Fumus persecutionis
- List of legal Latin terms
