= Ex demissione =

Legal phrase

Ex demissione (abbreviated ex dem.) is Legal Latin meaning "upon the demise" in which "demise" is used in its sense meaning "lease" or "transfer".

The phrase formed part of the title of the old action of ejectment. Thus, a case titled Jones v. Doe ex dem. Smith would signify that the nominal defendant, Doe, is the hypothetical person holding the estate "on the demise" of, i.e. by a lease from, real defendant Smith. Jones is the plaintiff.
