= In terrorem =

Legal threat used to avoid court proceesings or challenges

In terrorem, Latin for "into/about fear", is a legal threat, usually one given in hope of compelling someone to act without resorting to a lawsuit or criminal prosecution.

In terrorem clauses (referred to in English as no-contest clauses) are also used in wills to keep beneficiaries from contesting the will by either completely disinheriting them from any share, or reducing their share to a nominal amount. These clauses are not uniformly recognized.

== Examples of use ==
The term was used in the 2007 U.S. Supreme Court decision Bell Atlantic Corp. v. Twombly, which stated: "The requirement of allegations suggesting an agreement serves the practical purpose of preventing a plaintiff with 'a largely groundless claim' from 'tak[ing] up the time of a number of other people, with the right to do so representing an in terrorem increment of the settlement value'" (quoting Blue Chip Stamps v. Manor Drug Stores). In other words, the court worried that the threat of an expensive lawsuit (that was ultimately groundless) would nevertheless encourage settlements, and thus payments by innocent defendants, particularly in the case of antitrust lawsuits, which have a long and very expensive discovery process.

As the court alluded to in Twombly, the costs associated with discovery often underlay the economic calculus which may motivate the settlement of an in terrorem strike suit. The Private Securities Litigation Reform Act of 1995 created a heightened pleading standard for cases involving violations of securities regulation in the United States in response to perceptions of abuse in this area. This increased particularity is a departure from the "notice pleading" standard enumerated in the Federal Rules of Civil Procedure which would otherwise apply.

In some US states, in terrorem clauses are disfavored, but can still be enforceable. In New York, for example, the Estates, Powers and Trust Law codifies the use of, and the limits of, in terrorem clauses in EPT 3-3.5(b).

In terrorem has also been referred to by the High Court of Australia in the 2012 case of Andrews v Australia and New Zealand Banking Group Ltd. The unanimous judgement referred to the term when describing the doctrine of penalties and its operation in the case of unfair fees levied by large banks against their customers.

Many intellectual property attorneys send in terrorem letters to persons accused of violating their clients' trademark rights, before resorting to court proceedings, which threaten litigation if the accused do not comply with the written demand.

The Apache License prevents patent litigation, by threatening further litigation from revoking the patent rights granted under the license to anyone who sues for patent infringement.

If You institute patent litigation against any entity (including a cross-claim or counterclaim in a lawsuit) alleging that the Work or a Contribution incorporated within the Work constitutes direct or contributory patent infringement, then any patent licenses granted to You under this License for that Work shall terminate as of the date such litigation is filed.

The term in terrorem is also sometimes used in law to describe slippery slope or snowball effect arguments, as in the following passage:

This state of affairs (i.e., that claims of mere forgetfulness, perhaps based on carelessness, might result in an acquittal) stirs anxiety in some people. This leads to in terrorem arguments, complete with warnings that our bail system, as we know it, will collapse if courts were to indulge such doubtful claims.

—R. v. Withworth, 2013 ONSC 7413 (CanLII) (Ontario Superior Court of Justice, Trotter J.)

== See also ==
- Argumentum ad baculum
- Barratry (common law)
- Graduated response (a series of in terrorem communications to file sharers)
- Strategic lawsuit against public participation
