= Sub modo =

Sub modo is Latin for "subject to a modification or qualification". More generally, it is anything "under a qualification, condition, or restriction." In a contract sub modo, the agreement between the parties may be altered or limited within certain parameters.

For example, in a 19th-century United States Supreme Court case, Eldridge v. Trezevant, 160 U.S. 452 (1896), a landowner with property adjoining the Mississippi River filed for an injunction to block the State of Louisiana from building a levee through his property. Citing an earlier Louisiana case, Ruch v. New Orleans, 43 La. Ann. 275, the court upheld a lower court's dismissal of the injunction, stating:

Under the doctrine of a servitude, the riparian owner enjoys his property sub modo, i.e. subject to the right of the public to reserve space enough for levees, public works, and the like; that over this space the front proprietor never acquires complete dominion. It never passes free of this reservation to a purchaser.

In other words, in this particular case, the court held that there are certain inherent limitations to property ownership.

An agreement sub modo does not just apply to real property. Any agreement, contract, license, privilege, or right can be sub modo.

Generally, the term is considered archaic and somewhat dandified.

== See also ==
- Eminent domain
- List of Latin legal terms
