= Jus inter gentes =

Body of international agreements

Jus inter gentes, is the body of treaties, U.N. conventions, and other international agreements. Originally a Roman law concept, it later became a major part of public international law. The other major part is jus gentium, the Law of Nations. Jus inter gentes, literally, means "law between the peoples".

This is not the same as jus gentium, argues Francisco Martin and his co-authors in "International Human Rights and Humanitarian Law" (2006), because jus inter gentes includes internationally recognized human rights.

== See also ==
- Human rights violations
- International law
- Jus gentium
- Law of nations
- United Nations
