= Strike suit =

Lawsuit of questionable merit

A strike suit is a lawsuit of questionable merit brought by a single person or group of people with the purpose of gaining a private settlement before going to court that would be less than the cost of the defendant's legal costs. Such suits frequently appear where the defendant is a considerably larger entity than the plaintiff, such as a corporation or an estate.

== Strike suits in securities law ==
Company shareholders sometimes use strike suits as a means of addressing perceived failures by or discontentment with the company while avoiding becoming embroiled in litigation themselves.

- A minor shareholder sues a company for falling short on projected earnings. The lawsuit makes multiple technical claims of incompetence by the company.
- A minor shareholder sues a company for failure to follow bylaws set by the company. The lawsuit makes multiple technical claims of bylaw infractions by the company.

== See also ==
- In terrorem
- Patent trolls
