= Settlement (litigation) =

Resolution between disputing parties about a legal case

In law, a settlement is a resolution between disputing parties about a legal case, reached either before or after court action begins. A collective settlement is a settlement of multiple similar legal cases. The term also has other meanings in the context of law. Structured settlements provide for future periodic payments, instead of a one-time cash payment.

== Basis ==
A settlement, as well as dealing with the dispute between the parties is a contract between those parties, and is one possible (and common) result when parties sue (or contemplate so doing) each other in civil proceedings. The plaintiffs and defendants identified in the lawsuit can end the dispute between themselves without a trial.

The contract is based upon the bargain that a party forgoes its ability to sue (if it has not sued already), or to continue with the claim (if the plaintiff has sued), in return for the certainty written into the settlement. The courts will enforce the settlement. If it is breached, the party in default could be sued for breach of that contract. In some jurisdictions, the party in default could also face the original action being restored.

The settlement of the lawsuit defines legal requirements of the parties and is often put in force by an order of the court after a joint stipulation by the parties. In other situations (as where the claims have been satisfied by the payment of a certain sum of money), the plaintiff and defendant can simply file a notice that the case has been dismissed.

The majority of cases are decided by a settlement. Both sides (regardless of relative monetary resources) often have a strong incentive to settle to avoid the costs (such as legal fees, finding expert witnesses, etc.), the time and the stress associated with a trial, particularly where a trial by jury is available. Generally, one side or the other will make a settlement offer early in litigation. The parties may hold (and indeed, the court may require) a settlement conference, at which they attempt to reach such a settlement.

In controversial cases, it may be written into a settlement that both sides keep its contents and all other information relevant to the case confidential or that one of the parties (usually the one being sued) does not, by agreeing to the settlement, admit to any fault or wrongdoing in the underlying issue.

Where both parties agree to bear their own costs and walk away from the dispute, the settlement may be referred to as a "drop hands" settlement.

A "global settlement" is one employed where suits have been filed or charges brought in multiple jurisdictions and is defined as "a legal agreement that addresses or compromises both civil claims and criminal charges against a corporation or other large entity". Examples of a global settlement include the Tobacco Master Settlement Agreement between the attorneys general of 46 U.S. states and the four major U.S. tobacco companies in 1999. Another example is within the Global Analyst Research Settlements.

== Elements ==
Settlement agreements generally include several standard elements:

- Identify parties and counsel and define any unusual terms.
- Describe the dispute and identify any litigation by case number.
- Define claims released.
- Specify obligations and undertakings assumed, including any forbearances.
- State consideration for each release and obligation.
- Apportion or specify treatment of payments for tax and insurance purposes.
- Disclaim any admission of liability from decision to compromise.
- Disposition of any pending litigation, such as dismissals or stipulated judgments.
- Disposition of any future litigation between the parties.
- Enumerate how to handle contingencies through mechanisms such as liquidated damages or stipulation to immediate equitable relief.
- Disposition of collateral items such as fees and costs.
- Standard recitals found in most formal contracts, such as integration, severability, choice-of-law, venue, and execution in counterparts.

== Specific jurisdictions ==
=== United States ===
Usually, lawsuits end in a settlement, with an empirical analysis finding that less than 2% of cases end with a trial, 90% of torts settle, and around 50% of other civil cases settle. In American law, settlement agreements are normally private contracts, not court orders, except for consent decrees, which are relatively uncommon in the United States.

==== Confidentiality ====
Most settlements are confidential. In these cases, the court order may refer to another document which is not disclosed, but which may be revealed to prove a breach of the settlement. Confidentiality is not possible in class action cases in the United States, where all settlements are subject to approval by the court pursuant to Rule 23 of the Federal Rules of Civil Procedure and counterpart rules adopted in most states.

In some cases, confidential settlements are requested in discovery. Federal courts can issue protective orders preventing the release, but the party seeking to prevent disclosure must show that harm or prejudice would result from the disclosure. In certain states such as California, however, the burden is on the party seeking release of the confidential settlement.

==== Limitations ====
The confidentiality of settlements is controversial as it allows damaging actions to remain secret, as occurred in the Catholic sexual abuse scandal. In response, some states have passed laws which limit confidentiality. For example, in 1990 Florida passed a 'Sunshine in Litigation' law which limits confidentiality from concealing public hazards. Washington State, Texas, Arkansas, and Louisiana have laws limiting confidentiality as well, although judicial interpretation has weakened the application of these types of laws. In the U.S. Congress, a similar federal Sunshine in Litigation Act has been proposed but not passed in 2009, 2011, 2014, and 2015. Confidentiality agreements which keep secrets from regulators about violations is probably unenforceable, but a specific carveout granting regulators access is usually not included.

=== England and Wales ===
In England and Wales, if the matter is already before the courts, except in a case where the claim is to be dismissed outright and the Claimant agrees to pay the Defendant's costs, the matter is usually dealt with by a consent order, signed by the legal representatives of both parties and approved by the judge.

To get around the issue of confidentiality referred to above, a standard procedure consent order, known as a Tomlin Order is entered into. The order itself contains an agreement that the claim is stayed and no further action can be taken in court (except for referring a dispute in the implementation of the order to court, which is allowed). The order also deals with payment of costs, and payments of money out of court if any money is held by the court (as these are matters which must be dealt with by Court Order). However, the actual terms of the settlement are dealt with in a 'schedule' to the order, which can remain confidential. Breach of the schedule can be dealt with as breach of contract, or breach of the consent order.

=== Israel ===
In Israel, which is a common law jurisdiction, settlements almost always are submitted to the court, for two reasons: (a) only by submitting the settlement to the court can the litigants control whether the court will order one or more parties to pay costs, and (b) the plaintiff (claimant) usually prefers for the settlement to be given the effect of a judgment.

=== European Union ===
In a Danish public sector contracting case, Finn Frogne A/S v Rigspolitiet ved Center for Beredskabskommunikation, the EU's Court of Justice ruled that a settlement agreement in relation to a dispute between a public body and a contractor could in some cases amount to a material amendment to their contract, for which public procurement legislation specifies that a new tender should have taken place. In this case, the settlement agreement reduced the scope of the contract, but the court's view was that other operators might have wanted to take on the reduced-scope provision.

== See also ==
- Coercion – Forcing involuntary behavior in another
- Door-in-the-face technique – Starting with an unreasonable offer to make the next one more appealing
- Legal remedy – Court-enforced rights or penalties
- Pierringer release – Type of settlement agreement
- Plea bargain – Agreement in a criminal case between the prosecutor and defendant
- Strike suit – Lawsuit of questionable merit
