= Secundum formam statuti =

Legal term

Secundum formam statuti is a legal term which means: "according to the form of the statute" ^{1}.

In Commentaries on the Laws of England,

"And it has much enhanced the expense of all legal proceedings: for since the practitioners are confined (for the sake of the stamp duties, which are thereby considerably increased) to write only a stated number of words in a sheet; and as the English language, through the multitude of its particles, is much more verbose than the Latin; it follows that the number of sheets must be very much augmented by the change.23[*]"

Correlation of 23[*] is to, the notes quoted later on that page, "For instance, these words, "secundum formam statuti," are now converted into seven, "according to the form of the statute."^{2}

== History and contextual examples ==
British history of court cases show Secundum formam statuti used in the early 1600s. Case with usage,

"Martis, 16 Junii, 1607
Privilege.
IN a Writ De partitione facienda, brought by Constance Lady Lucye, Widow, against Sir Robert Oxenbridge Knight, One of the Members of the House, in the Court
of Common Pleas, the said Sir Robert made Default in his Appearance; whereupon a Writ was directed to the Sheriff to levy Issues.
Motion was made for Privilege, on the behalf of the said Sir Robert: The Order of the Court, and the Writ read, in this Form:
...parturition inde inter es, secundum formam statuti in commodious casu proviso..."^{3}

From, 'FORMEDON, old English law', there is found,

"The writ of formedon is nearly obsolete, it having been superseded by the writ of ejectment...of the particular estate, displaced and turned into a mere right, the remedy is by action of formedon, displaced and turned into a mere right, the remedy is by action of formedon, (secundum formam doni,) because the writ comprehends the form of the gift."^{4}

Found in 'The Case of Bankrupts'; ( Smith v. Mills) (1589) Trinity Term, 31 Elizabeth I; In the Court of the King's Bench. First Published in the Reports, volume 2, page 25a,

"and other good merchants of London, brought an action upon the case upon trover and conversion of divers goods, in London, against Thomas Mills, and upon not guilty pleaded, the jury gave a special verdict to this effect: ... was possessed of the same goods, and exercising the trade of buying and selling, ...became a bankrupt, and absented himself secundum formam statuti,..."^{5}

And in 'Shelley's Case'; (1581) Trinity Term, 23 Elizabeth I In the Court of King's Bench, before all the Justices of England. First Published in the Reports, volume 1, page 93b,

"But it hath been said, that the Statute De Dionis Condition albus aids and helps the heir male of the body to take, for that the will of the donor appears, that the heir male of his body should have the land; and the statute saith, quod voluntas donatoris secundum formam in charta doni Sui manifeste expressa, De caetero observetur [Ed.: that the will of the donor be from henceforth observed, according to the form manifestly expressed in the charter of gift.]."^{6}

In the Italian, '1STATUTI DI REGGIO D'EMILIA NELLA COMPILAZIONE DEL 1265 CON AGGIUNTE E MODIFICATION DEGLI ANNI 1266-1275',

"Niel margarine superiore Del foglio 1 : 1270
IN nomine domini, millesimo ducentesimo LXX, indictione XIIII;...per statutarios electos secundum formam statuti ad sortem in consilio generali,..."^{7}

Translated, in the advanced margin of the sheet, number 1270, In nominations, dominions, ..., for statutes elected secundum formam statuti...

== Sources ==
- Black's Law Dictionary, 4th Revised Edition, p. 1521.
- Commentaries on the Laws of England, by William Blackstone; 'BOOK 3, CHAPTER 21
- Of Issue and Demurrer; <>
- From: 'House of Commons Journal Volume 1: 16 June 1607', Journal of the House of Commons: volume 1: 1547-1629 (1802), pp. 383–384. URL: http://www.british-history.ac.uk/report.aspx?compid=9086 Date accessed: 16 May 2012.
- 'FORMEDON, old English law', entry in 'Law Dictionary', online, <http://www.law-dictionary.org/FORMEDON%2C+old+English+law.asp?q=FORMEDON%2C+old+English+law>
- http://oll.libertyfund.org/?option=com_staticxt&staticfile=show.php%3Ftitle=911&chapter=106307&layout=html&Itemid=27
- <http://oll.libertyfund.org/?option=com_staticxt&staticfile=show.php%3Ftitle=911&chapter=106306&layout=html&Itemid=27>
- '1STATUTI DI REGGIO D'EMILIA NELLA COMPILAZIONE DEL 1265 CON AGGIUNTE E MODIFICAZIONI DEGLI ANNI 1266-1275' <https://web.archive.org/web/20131228224037/http://www.itinerarimedievali.unipr.it/v2/pdf/reggio_statuti_liber_primus.pdf>
