= Et uxor =

Latin phrase

Et uxor is a Latin phrase meaning "and wife", commonly abbreviated "et ux." The term is a legal phrase that is used in lieu of naming the wife of a male litigant, for example Loving et ux. v. Virginia, or V. Mueller Company et al., Appellants, v. Albert Corley et ux., Appellees.

The term remains in contemporary use in American legal documents, especially as related to property and marriage. Many older property deeds list the owners in the form "John Smith et ux", but in the present day most jurisdictions would indicate both the husband and the wife by name.

== See also ==
- Et vir
