= Falsus in uno, falsus in omnibus =

Latin maxim

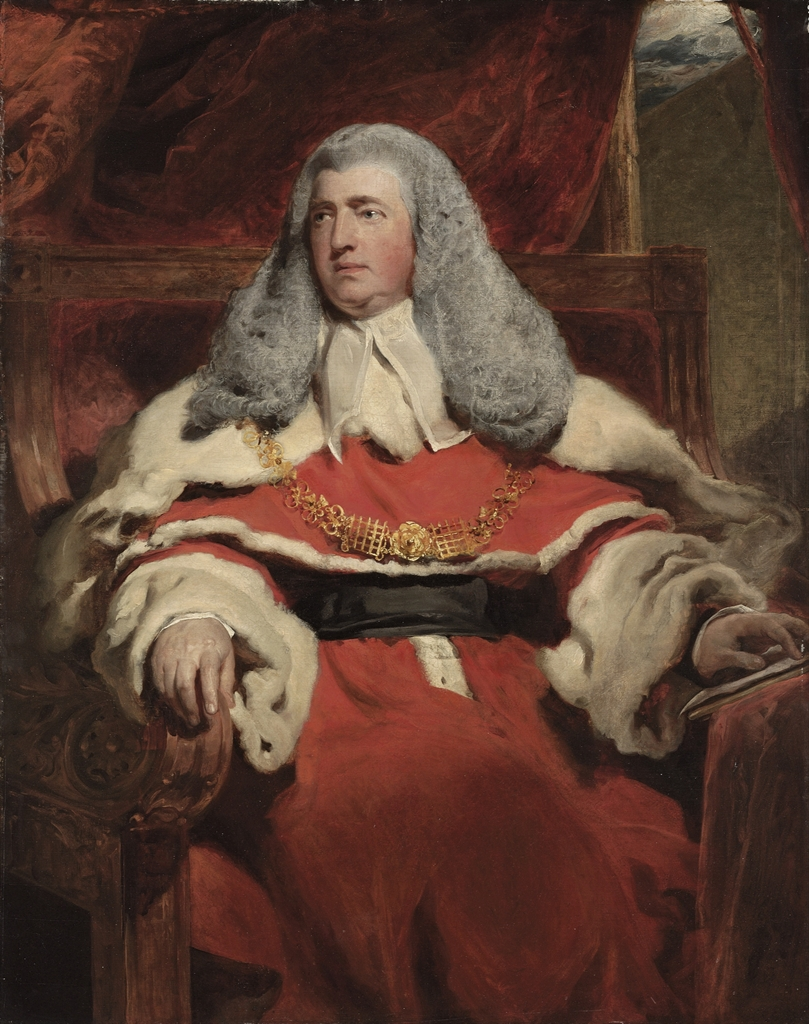
Although Edward Law, 1st Baron Ellenborough (pictured) rejected a categorical application of the rule falsus in uno, falsus in omnibus for English courts in the year 1809, the doctrine survives in some American jurisdictions.

Falsus in uno, falsus in omnibus is a Latin maxim meaning "false in one thing, false in everything". At common law, it is the legal principle that a witness who falsely testifies about one matter is not credible to testify about any matter. While many common law jurisdictions reject categorical application of the rule, the doctrine survives in some American courts.

== Origins ==
The origins of the doctrine of falsus in uno, falsus in omnibus in the common law have been traced as far back as the Stuart Treason Trials in the late seventeenth century. However, the widespread acceptance of the principle in seventeenth century English courts suggests that the doctrine has much earlier roots. In the seventeenth and eighteenth centuries, the principle functioned as a mandatory presumption that a witness was unreliable if they previously lied while offering testimony. By the early nineteenth century, English courts began instructing juries that they may presume a witness who testified falsely was unreliable, but such a presumption was not mandatory. In 1809, Lord Ellenborough rejected a categorical application of the rule, stating that "though a person may be proved on his own shewing, or by other evidence, to have foresworn himself as to a particular fact; it does not follow that he can never afterwards feel the obligation of an oath." Although some American courts disfavor the mandatory application of the doctrine, others continue to uphold a mandatory presumption of unreliability for witnesses that have previously testified falsely.

== Contemporary usage ==
Today, many jurisdictions have abandoned the principle as a formal rule of evidence and instead apply the rule as a "permissible inference that the jury may or may not draw." However, some courts continue to apply the doctrine to discredit witnesses that have previously offered false testimony. In 2013, for example, the United States Court of Appeals for the Ninth Circuit held that in immigration cases, a court may "use an adverse credibility finding on one claim to support an adverse finding on another claim." Likewise, at the O.J. Simpson murder trial, Judge Lance Ito applied the doctrine to instruct the jury that a "witness who is willfully false in one material part of his or her testimony is to be distrusted in others."

== Criticisms of the doctrine ==
Many legal scholars have criticized the continued use of the doctrine of falsus in uno to discredit a witness' entire testimony. For example, Judge Richard Posner once remarked that falsus in uno was a "discredited doctrine" based on "primitive psychology". This assertion was not made in relation to fraudulent documentation or a "material" inconsistency; rather, it was based on what the court characterizes as "innocent mistakes, trivial inconsistencies, and harmless exaggerations" by the applicant during his testimony before an immigration judge. Indeed, later in the Kadia opinion, the court concedes that inconsistencies of less than material importance can[NOT] be relevant to the assessment of veracity. Specifically, the court stated that "the mistakes that witnesses make in all innocence must be distinguished from slips that, whether or not they go to the core of the witness's testimony, show that the witness is a liar." Judge Posner argued that because witnesses "are prone to fudge, to fumble, to misspeak, to misstate, to exaggerate", few trials would reach a judgment if "any such pratfall warranted disbelieving a witness's entire testimony." Additionally, evidence scholar John Henry Wigmore was an outspoken critic of the doctrine. In his Treatise on the Anglo-American System of Evidence in Trials at Common Law, he wrote:

It may be said, once for all, that the maxim is in itself worthless, first, in point of validity, because in one form it merely contains in loose fashion a kernel of truth which no one needs to be told, and in the others it is absolutely false as a maxim of life; and secondly, in point of utility, because it merely tells the jury what they may do in any event, not what they must do or must not do, and therefore it is a superfluous form of words. It is also in practice pernicious, first, because there is frequently a misunderstanding of its proper force, and secondly, because it has become in the hands of many counsel a mere instrument for obtaining new trials upon points wholly unimportant in themselves.

== See also ==
- Roman law
- Common law
- Evidence
