= Et vir =

Et vir is a Latin phrase meaning "and husband". It is used in legal literature to indicate a couple comprising an identified woman and her otherwise unidentified husband. The U.S. Supreme Court case Troxel et vir v. Granville is an example of modern legal usage of the Latin phrase. Additionally, many property deeds would list the owners in the form "Jane Doe et vir" when appropriate.

== See also ==
- Et uxor
