= Essentialia negotii =

Essentialia negotii (English: essential aspects or basic terms) is a Latin legal term used in contract law. It denotes the minimum contents of a contract in order for it to be held effective and legally binding.

== General contracts ==
However, the court may not just hold that a contract is invalid. In England, the Sale of Goods Act 1979 s.8(2) states ‘the buyer must pay reasonable price’ when a contract of sale is silent on price. Accordingly the absence of price may not be fatal to a contract of sale.

Accidentalia negotii are additional agreements that can be regulated in a contract. They are ancillary points, opposed to essentialia negotii.

== Employment contracts ==
In contracts of employment, essential terms can include not just pay and a basic job description (the work-wage bargain) but also to specifics on holidays, a notice period in the event of dismissal, the place of work, any collective agreements and whether the job is expected to be permanent or a fixed term contract. These are examples under European Union law, implemented under Directive 91/533 on an employer's obligation to inform employees of the conditions applicable to the contract of employment relationship. Article 2 of the Directive states,

"1. An employer shall be obliged to notify an employee to whom this Directive applies hereinafter referred to as the "employee", of the essential aspects of the contract or employment relationship"

All countries in the European Union are required to "translate" directives into national legislation. An example of this is the Employment Rights Act 1996, section 1, in the United Kingdom, which sets out the obligation of employers to supply employees with a statement of written particulars within two months of employment beginning.

In the English speaking world, this notion has not survived as well as in civil law jurisdictions, for the doctrine of consideration has essentially covered the requirement of essential terms in basic bargains. However the concept of what is "essential" changes according to the nature of a particular contract, and so there may be fewer "essentials" in the case of a simple shopping exchange, and more essentials necessary for the proper functioning of a contract in the case of renting a home, taking out a bank loan or pursuing a career.

== See also ==
- Commercial law
- Sale of goods
- Lex Mercatoria
- Labour law
