= Deorum injuriae diis curae =

Latin maxim

Deorum injuriae diis curae (Note: Alternatively spelled iniuriae and dis, the latter some times capitalized, and sometimes separated with a comma: Deorum injuriae, Diis curae.) ('Injuries to the gods are the concern of the gods' or 'let wrongs done to the gods be avenged by the gods') is a Latin maxim. It is often invoked in relation to questions of blasphemy, libel, and free speech, positing that any insult to the divine should be left to divine vengeance rather than state punishment.

== Background and origin ==
In Ancient Rome, insults to the gods were generally not considered a concern of the law, as opposed to insults to other citizens (defamation). Due to the functioning of witnesses in Roman courts, perjury (false oath) was not subject to any penalty in Roman law (as opposed to false testimony, falsum testimonium, which was severely punished) but was instead considered an insult to the gods – and therefore subject to divine not legal retribution.

The phrase deorum injuriae diis curae appears in the first book of the Annals by Tacitus. The lex majestatis (law of treason), which in the days of the republic had been used to try overt acts rather than words, was according to Tacitus revived by Augustus to deal with libels targeting him. His successor Tiberius was later faced with the cases of one Falanius and one Rubrius, the latter accused of having committed perjury after swearing by the name of Augustus. Tacitus quotes Tiberius as writing to the consuls that "his father had not had a place in heaven decreed to him that the honor might be turned to the destruction of the citizens" and that, concerning the accusation of perjury, "the thing ought to be considered as if the man had deceived Jupiter. Wrongs done to the gods were the gods' concern."

Similar views had earlier been expressed by Cicero, who contrasted divine and human punishment for perjury (death and dishonor respectively), and stated that the gods are the one to punish the crime.

== History ==
With the ascent of Christianity in the Roman world, St. Augustine criticized this position in his City of God, believing it showed less respect to the gods than to men.

French revolutionary and lawyer Louis-Alexandre Devérité, writing under the guise of an Englishman reacting to the execution of François-Jean de la Barre, writes that the maxim "will [in England] remain engraved in the hearts of [their] magistrates", although Devérité attributes it to Cicero. Similarly Jonathan Swift, in an unfinished work titled Some Thoughts on Freethinking, claimed some decades earlier that the public in England "seems to be of opinion with Tiberius".

Thomas Jefferson, writing in a letter dated 1824 to George Thatcher, invoked the phrase approvingly in the context of conflicts of religion and sectarianism, asking "what interest has either of these respondents to claim pre-eminence for his dogma, and, usurping the judgment-seat of God, to condemn all the others to his wrath? in this case, I say with the wiser heathen 'deorum injuriae, diis curae'".

Tiberius' maxim is cited by John Stuart Mill in his On Liberty in opposition to legislation motivated by religion, with Mill contending that "[i]t remains to be proved that society or any of its officers holds a commission from on high to avenge any supposed offence to Omnipotence, which is not also a wrong to our fellow creatures."

At least since the middle of the 19th century, blasphemy has been framed less as a crime against divine sensibilities, but rather a crime against society, public order or feelings of believers – representing a secularization of blasphemy laws.
