= Inter rusticos =

Inter rusticos is Latin for "among rustics" or "illiterate persons". The term is used in legal terminology and legal maxims ("legal Latin"). Deeds or obligations granted "inter rusticos" are not judged by the same strict rules as those prepared by professionals, rather, they are dealt with more according to equitable principles than rules of strict law.
