= Ex tunc =

Latin legal term

Ex tunc is a legal term derived from Latin, and means "from the outset". It can be contrasted with ex nunc, which means "from now on". An example of usage of the term can be found in contract law, where voidance of a contract can lead to it either being void ex nunc, i.e. from then on, or ex tunc, in which case it is treated as though it had never come into existence.

Another example can be found in the ecclesiastical courts. These courts, after the conciliatory of Trente 1582, were granted the right to nullify a marriage ex tunc, meaning there was good reason it should be nullified. The consequence is that said couple were never married in the eyes of the church and can get married again by a priest, which they normally would not be able to do if they had divorced.

In some cases, in Italian Courts disqualification from incompatible offices has been declared ex tunc.
