= Ratio scripta =

"Ratio scripta", or "written reason", was the assessment of Roman law commonly held in Europe during the Medieval period. It emerged during the revival of Roman law, serving as the basis of the ius commune. It was also used to evaluate the validity of leges propria or the local customs and positive legislation. Ratio scripta is also used to denote the popular opinion of Roman law held during the Medieval period. It could also mean the written opinion of a tribunal explaining its decision over a case.

Ratio scripta was the basis of the popularity of the Roman law in medieval Europe. According to scholars, the Roman law was widely adopted because ratio or reason meant the law. In France, for instance, the Roman law is often invoked as a standard and as a reference to the law in general.
