= Ipsissima verba =

Legal and theological term

Ipsissima verba, Latin for "the very words," is a legal term referring to material, usually established authority, that a writer or speaker is quoting or referring to. For example, "the lawyer's position on segregation is supported by the ipsissima verba of the Supreme Court's holding in Brown v. Board of Education."

== Other uses ==
In Christian theology, ipsissima verba is often used to denote the words attributed to Christ in the Gospels, and the words of characters in the Bible generally. The concept could date from 1800-1810. Ipsissima verba is distinguished from ipsissima vox ('very voice') of Jesus Christ. Theology students are warned not to "make a fetish" of the Lord's words.

Ipsissima verba is also the name of an album of the German band Samsas Traum.
