= Nihil dicit =

Nihil dicit is Latin for "he says nothing"; a judgment for want of a plea. The name of a judgment which a judge may render against a defendant who failed to plead and failed to answer a plaintiff's declaration or complaint within the prescribed time limit. The defendant failed to say why the court should not issue the judgment against him. The failure to say constitutes an admission of the justice of the cause of action against the defendant; it does so more strongly than a mere default.

Basically, a plaintiff files a complaint asking a court to do something and a defendant must file an answer that disagrees. That is called "joining issue".

Example:

For instance, Smith's Plaintiff's Original Complaint says that Jones breached a contract by only delivering 5 items instead of the 10 items that the contract calls for. Jones files a Defendant's Original Answer which says that after the parties signed the contract they agreed on the phone to change the quantity to 5. That document is in fact an "Answer" because it disputes the Plaintiff's allegations.

However, instead Jones' Defendant's Original Answer might state, "I tried to buy 10 items for the contract with Smith, but my supplier had raised its prices and I could only afford 5. So I delivered the 5 I was able to buy."

Smith says, "We agreed on 10 but I only received 5." The document Jones filed does not dispute that. So Jones "says nothing". Although the document is titled "Defendant's Original Answer" in fact it is only an Appearance, since Jones did not "join issue".

Therefore, Jones has defaulted, even though he filed something titled "Answer".

Because "he says nothing", the court does not need to set a hearing, it can issue a default judgment, which is one type of "judgment on the pleadings". This specific type of "judgment on the pleadings" is called a "Nihil Dicit judgment".

== See also ==
- List of Latin phrases
