= Ad colligenda bona =

Ad colligenda bona is a Latin phrase that approximately translates as "to collect the goods". In cases involving something quid pro quo, a prosecutor may be eligible for certain goods. Or, if specific items i.e. estate are unclaimable, the state would collect their goods.

In English law, a grant ad colligenda bona is sometimes applied for by parties interested in the administration of a deceased person's estate. The grant is useful where it has not been possible to grant probate in solemn form; for example, because there is a dispute over the validity of the will. Unlike an ordinary executor or administrator, someone with a grant ad colligenda cannot make any distribution of the estate's assets. Their role is to protect the assets of the estate while the dispute surrounding the will is resolved.
