= Jus accrescendi =

Jus accrescendi, in Roman law, is the right of survivorship, the right of the survivor or survivors of two or more joint tenants to the tenancy or estate, upon the death of one or more of the joint tenants.

- Jus accrescendi inter mercatores, pro beneficio commercii, locum non habet: The right of survivorship has no place between merchants, for the benefit of commerce. Co. Litt. 182(1; 2 Story, Eq. Jur. | 1207; Broom, Max. 455. There is no survivorship in cases of partnership, in contrast to joint-tenancy. Story, Partn. § 00.
- Jus accrescendi praefertur oneribus: The right of survivorship is preferred to incumbrances. Co. Litt. 185o. Hence no dower or courtesy can be claimed out of a joint estate. 1 Steph. Comm. 316.
- Jus accrescendi praefertur ultima voluntati: The right of survivorship is preferred to the last will. Co. Litt 1856. A devise of one's share of a joint estate, by will, is no severance of the jointure; for no testament takes effect till after the death of the testator, and by such death the right of the survivor (which accrued at the original creation of the estate, and has therefore a priority to the other) is already vested. 2 Bl. Comm. 18(i; 3 Steph. Comm. 316.
