= No-contest clause =

Legal clause

A no-contest clause, also called an in terrorem clause, is a clause in a legal document, such as a contract or a will, that is designed to threaten someone, usually with litigation or criminal prosecution, into acting, refraining from action, or ceasing to act. The phrase is typically used to refer to a clause in a will that threatens to disinherit a beneficiary of the will if that beneficiary challenges the terms of the will in court. Many states in the United States hold a no-contest clause in a will to be unenforceable, so long as the person challenging the will has probable cause to do so.

== No-contest clause in wills ==
Unless there is probable cause, no-contest clauses are permitted by the Uniform Probate Code.

A provision in a will purporting to penalize an interested person for contesting the will or instituting other proceedings relating to the estate is unenforceable if probable cause exists for instituting proceedings.

— UPC §§ 2-517 and 3‑905

The UPC has been adopted in several smaller states, including Alaska, Idaho, Montana, and New Mexico, but also by Florida, one of the larger states in population.

== No-contest clauses by state ==
=== California ===
In California, no-contest clauses are of limited effect, and will divest a party that unsuccessfully contests a will containing such a clause only if the court determines that the party brought the action without probable cause. Probate Code §§ 21310–21315. These statutes, which comprise California's statutory scheme governing the enforceability of no-contest clauses, became effective January 1, 2010. As of that date, the predecessor statutes are repealed.

=== Florida ===
In Florida no-contest clauses in wills are specifically unenforceable, irrespective of probable cause, pursuant to statute. See Fla. Stat. 732.517 (2009) which states:

A provision in a will purporting to penalize any interested person for contesting the will or instituting other proceedings relating to the estate is unenforceable.

=== Massachusetts ===
Massachusetts General Laws allow for penalty-clause-for-contest language in wills. See M.G.L. Ch. 190B, Art. II, Sec. 2-517.

A provision in a will purporting to penalize an interested person for contesting the will or instituting other proceedings relating to the estate is enforceable.

=== Nevada ===
Nevada law specifically directs the court to enforce no-contest clauses. These statutes recognize that a beneficiary may, without penalty, seek enforcement of the will or trust, seek a judicial ruling as to the meaning of the will or trust. The statutes also recognize an exception where legal action challenging the validity of the document is "instituted in good faith and based on probable cause that would have led a reasonable person, properly informed and advised, to conclude that there was a substantial likelihood that the trust or other trust-related instrument was invalid."

=== New York ===
New York has rejected the "probable cause" defense to enforcement of such clauses. Such clauses are given full effect upon challenge. Some exceptions apply, e.g. election against the will by a minor, contest on ground of forgery or revocation by later Will.

New York's estates, powers and trusts law specifically states:

A condition, designed to prevent a disposition from taking effect in case the will is contested by the beneficiary, is operative despite the presence or absence of probable cause for such contest, subject to [exceptions]

— N.Y. EPTL § 3-3.5

=== Texas ===
Texas allows for a no-contest clause to be challenged for just cause and provided the action to challenge was made in good faith.

=== Oregon ===
Oregon enforces no-contest clauses against losing parties even when there was probable cause to contest the will.
