= Ius =

Rights to citizenship virtue in ancient Rome

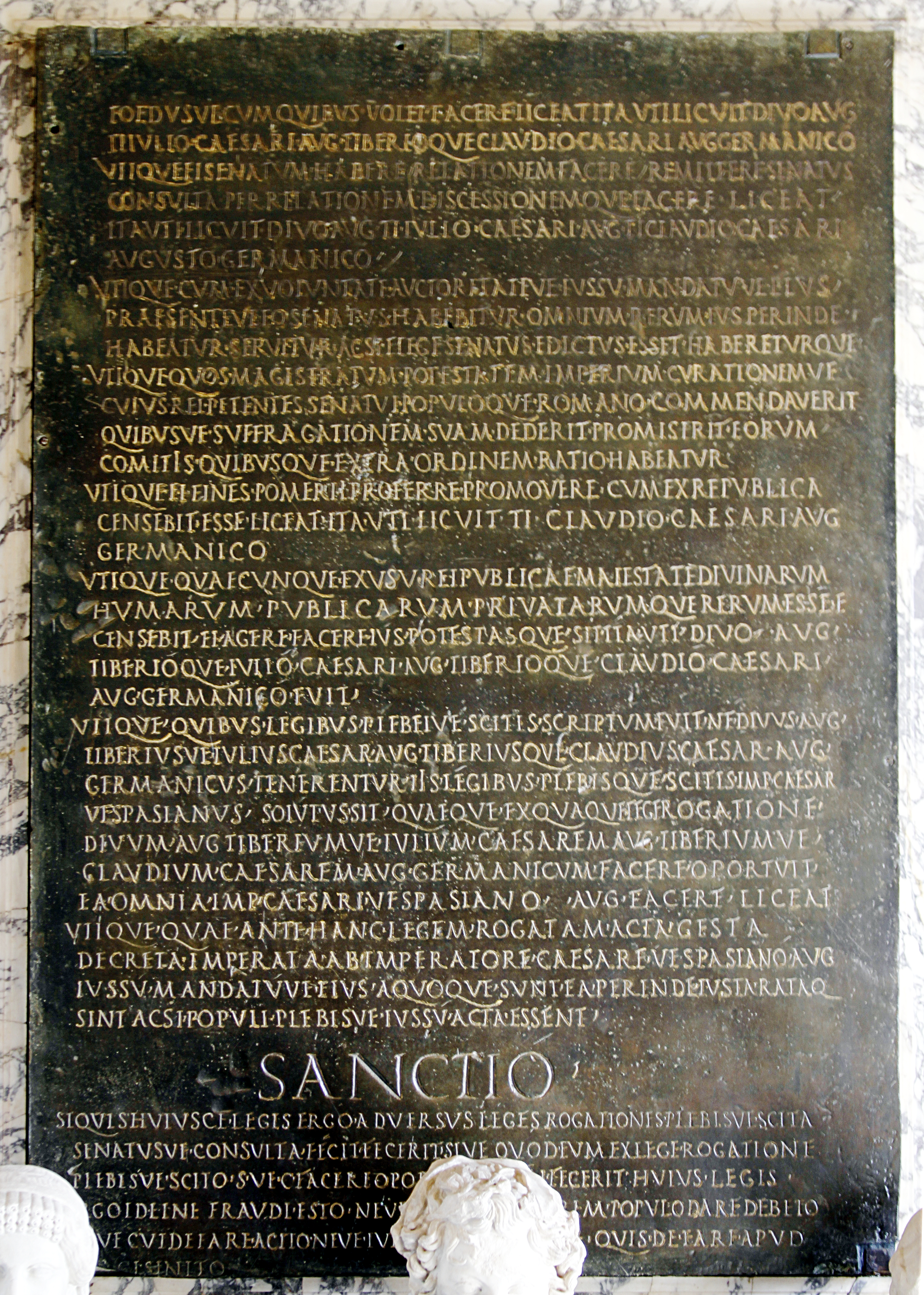
A bronze tablet in the Capitoline Museums recording a law of the Senate now termed the Lex de imperio Vespasiani, establishing Vespasian in his imperial munus. Section VI states that "whatsoever he shall think likely to promote the welfare of the state ... he shall have full right (ius) and authority (potestas) to do." This senatus consultum gives the emperor the absolute right to make decisions, a concept later adopted by the absolute monarchies of Europe. This legislation forestalled any questions about whether the emperor had a right to exercise the authority of the state in any way he pleased. In fact, such questioning was against the law as infringing on the emperor's rights. The death penalty was frequently invoked for such questioning, depending on the emperor (not under Vespasian, who was considered a good emperor).

Ius or jus (Latin, plural iura) in ancient Rome was a right to which a citizen (civis) was entitled by virtue of his citizenship (civitas). The iura were specified by laws, so ius sometimes meant law. As one went to the law courts to sue for one's rights, ius also meant justice and the place where justice was sought.

On the whole, the Romans valued their rights as the greatest good of Roman citizenship (civitas romana), as opposed to citizenship in other city-states under the jurisdiction of Rome but without Roman rights. Outsiders (peregrini) and freedmen (libertini) perforce used Roman lawyers to represent them in actions undertaken under the jurisdiction of Roman law. Representation was one of the civic obligations (munera) owed to the state by citizens. These munera (on which account the citizens were municipes) included military service as well as paying taxes, but specialized obligations might also be associated with functions of elected offices or assigned by the government, such as paying the cost of road or aqueduct maintenance. Some of these functions were highly lucrative, such as tax collecting, since the collector collected much more than he owed the government, but for the most part functionaries were appointed for their wealth and were expected to assume the costs as their munus. If they did not, they were tried and sometimes executed. Violation of the iura of other citizens, whether in office or out, was a serious matter, for which the punishment might be death.

== Meanings of ius ==
Ius in ancient Roman law had two principal meanings, which are still reflected in French droit, German Recht, English right and Castilian derecho. Ferdinand Mackeldy, 19th-century jurist, analyzed them into two principles: ius is the law, a set of compulsory rules (Jus est norma agendi, "law is a rule of conduct"), which he called objective or positive law, and a set of possibilities to act (Jus est facultas agendi, "law is a license to act"), which he called subjective law, or duties.

=== Aequum et bonum ===
Ius was defined by the jurists Publius Juventius Celsus and Julius Paulus as the aequum et bonum, "the just and the fair", or justice. Jurisprudence was the art of bringing it about through application of the laws; thus ius was law in the abstract, as in the English usage of the term "the law". Iura were "the whole of laws" (iura populi Romani), not a list of all the laws, but the very principle of legality, which might be applied through this law or by the magistrates and lawyers of Rome through disputation in the law courts. Ius might be something less than the whole body of law when special fields were designated by an adjective, such as ius publicum, "public law," as opposed to private law.

The actual laws (leges), or written statutes, were only the specific tools through which ius was applied. Ius was the law in its broadest sense or its ideal state, above and unaffected by the contingent decrees that the state happened to enact—hence the distinction between the English terms justice and legislation.

=== Jura et potestates ===
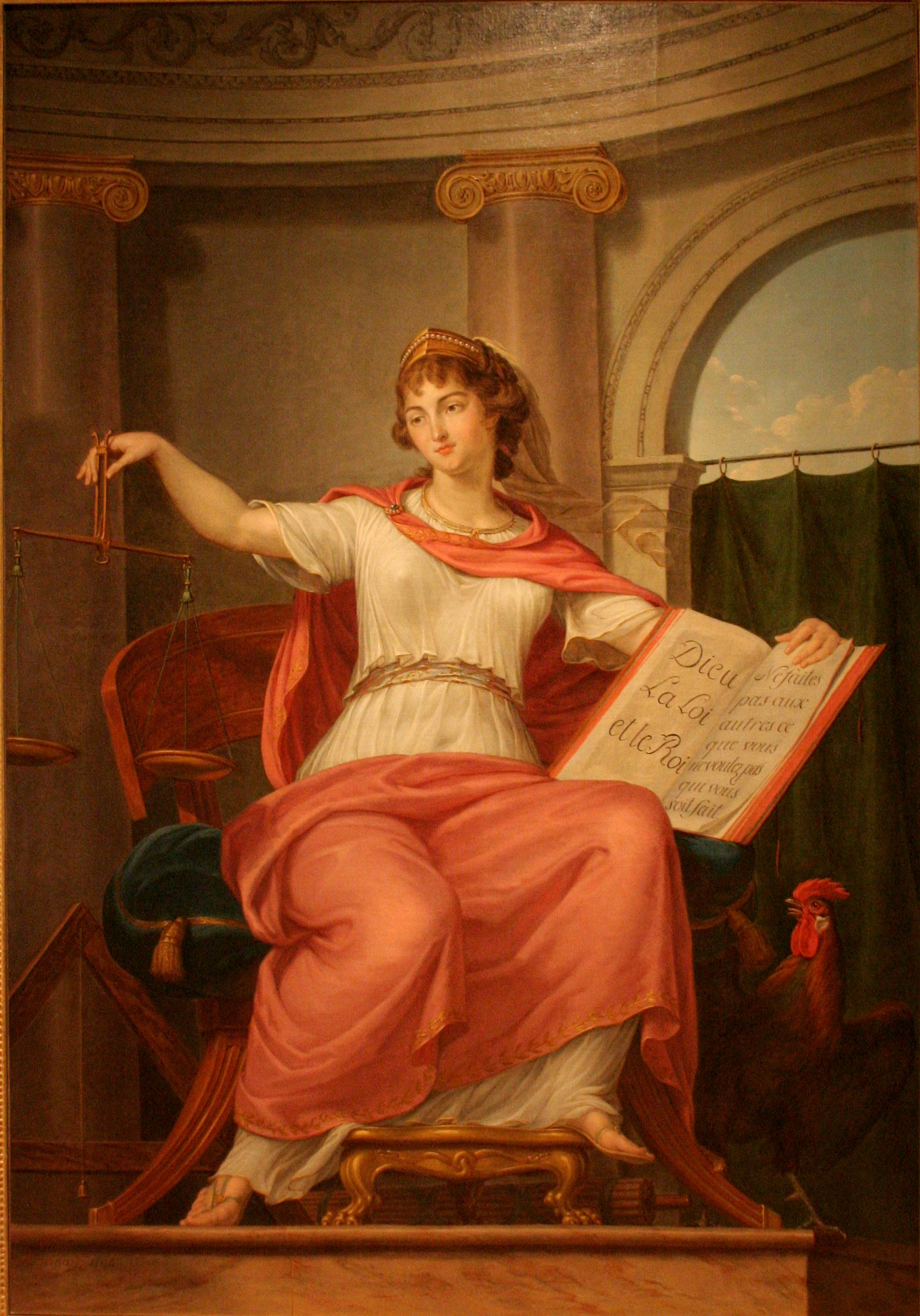
A personification of justice by Bernard d'Agesci. La justice holds scales in one hand and in the other hand a book with "Dieu, la Loi, et le Roi" (God, the Law and the King) on one page and the Golden Rule on the other page.

Ius as the law was generally the domain of Roman aristocrats, from whose ranks the magistrates were chosen and who often defended clients in court. On a more practical basis, the populace of Rome daily encountered the primary meaning of ius. They understood that they had rights. Furthermore, these rights could be named and enumerated in formulae beginning with the word ius followed by a descriptive phrase, most often in the genitive case: "the right of ...."

Black defines ius in the sense of a right as "a power, privilege, faculty, or demand inherent in one person and incident upon another." This power, or potestas, was a license governing behavior between persons granted by the constitution. It determined what one citizen or group of citizens could or could not do regarding another; i.e., potestas is to be translated as authority, which the possession of iura gave to individuals. One might act socially sui iuris, on one's own authority, asserting one's own right, or on behalf of another, alieni iuris, in response to a demand to serve his right by being under his authority.

This was the principle binding soldiers in the army: the consul, or a commander of some other rank, had a right to demand public service of citizens in the army, who were then under his authority. The magistrates thus had the right and power to draft men into the army at any time, but this demand was never a private affair; the males were lawfully assembled and selections were made by the commanders of the units. Typically, the right to raise a legion from a given populace for a specified purpose under the Roman Republic had to be granted by a senatus consultum, a decree of the Senate.

Similarly, under the Roman Empire the imperator ("commander") was from a legal point of view the chief magistrate whose major ius was the ordering of all public affairs, for which he could demand assistance from anyone at any time. The cynical demands of the bad emperors and the beneficial ones of the good emperors are described at great length by the historians of the empire, such as Tacitus.

The list below contains iura from different branches of Roman civilization. A ius of ancient Rome, marked by the imperial eagle, typically begins in the Roman Republic and continues through the Roman Empire. A ius of the Holy Roman Empire is marked with the double-headed eagle. The term is used in this article in the general sense to mean also the Carolingian Empire, named after Charlemagne, who had the title Holy Roman Emperor. His domain also included what is now France. Its iura reflect early Germanic laws. They are more likely to be found as legal principles in modern European countries. Iura that originated and remained primarily as canon law are marked with the coat of arms of the Holy See.

== A ==
Name	Literal Translation	Provenience, Jurisdiction	Description
ius abstinendi with potestas abstinendi supplemented by the beneficium abstinendi	Right of refusal with the power of refusal supplemented by the privilege of refusal	Roman Republic on its claim based on the Twelve Tables, supplemented by the Praetorian Edict, Roman Empire	In keeping with the high value placed by the Romans on family, they developed a complex system of transmitting family rights and property. That any family should disappear through lack of heirs was abhorrent. An inheritance (haereditas) began with the rights (iura) and goods (bona) possessed by a citizen, regardless of whether there were any heirs to tenant it in the future. For the time being the citizen tenanted it. His civic duty was to find heirs (haeres). The preferred way to do this was to have children and designate them as heirs in a will (testamentum). These were voluntarii (or extranei or sui) because they had the ius abstinendi, carrying the power (potestas) of refusal. They might do that if the estate were hopelessly encumbered by debt. If the owner of the property died intestate, the law designated heirs, preferably other relatives, who were called necessarii, because they had no right of refusal. A haereditas was not automatically conferred on its heres as it is today. On the death of the testator the estate entered a pending period (delatio) during which the heirs must apply and either prove that they were qualified to be heirs or be disqualified. Voluntarii would state their intentions to accept or refuse at this time. If no qualified heirs were found, the haereditas reverted to the state, ending the family line, not considered a desirable outcome. The Praetorian Edict assigned the problem of finding heirs to the praetor, a Roman magistrate, who could appoint a manager (possessor bonorum). Before he did, the will of a pending inheritance was considered to continue the testator. A possessor assumed title as though the will were his own. He was a necessarius, but the praetor could grant him on application the beneficium abstinendi, the privilege of refusing. After the heirs were approved the estate entered the adquisitio phase. The testamentum was now of no effect. Roman wills never extended the testator. He and any possessor were vacated at this time. Joint heirs had to be all voluntarii or all necessarii; mixed inheritance was not allowed. If no heirs had been found, the possessor kept the estate, as he had already vacated the testator.
ius abutendi	right to consume	Roman Catholic Church, 14th century on	Devised by Cardinal Bertrand de la Tour in support of Pope John XXII's stance in his bull, Ad Conditorem Canonum, issued 8 December 1322. The ius, also known as ius consumendi, builds on the Roman ius utendi, asserting that not only does a possessor have the right to use his property as he sees fit, but also to consume it. This ius establishes that Christ and the apostles "had the right to use, use up, sell, donate or acquire" property.
ius accrescendi	right of increase, accrual, accrescence or accretion	Roman Republic, Roman Empire	In ancient Rome the right of accrual belonged to the joint heirs (haeres), male or female, of an expected inheritance (haereditas), whether to be transmitted by will (testamentum) or by law in the case of intestate inheritance. If any of the heirs should die or become ineligible to inherit for any reason before the death of the testator, the share of the other heirs increased by a percentage of the vacated share. This rule took precedence over any testament left by the deceased heir. Alternatives could be designated under some circumstances. There were exceptions and conditions, which required adjudication. Vacated shares for which heirs could not be found were forfeited to the government. In 9 AD the lex Pappia et Poppaea modified the Lex Julia of 18 BC (early empire), being called informally on that account the Lex Julia et Pappia Poppaea. It excluded a caelebs, an unmarried person, male or female from inheriting unless he or she married within 100 days of the death of the testator. Also excluded were orbi, or childless couples between 25 and 60 years of age for the male and 20 and 50 for the female. The intent of the law was to discourage childlessness. The emperor Justinian removed these conditions, restoring the republican form in favor of Christians who had decided to live celibate. The ius is sometimes called the right of survivorship, the modern term for the disposition of joint property to the survivors, dating from the Middle Ages. Accrescendi, however, does not mean survivorship; moreover, the Roman use only covered the survival of joint heirs. Although general survivorship rules undoubtedly did develop from the ius accrescendi, they are not the same as the Roman.
ius ad rem, ius in personam, ius personale	right to a thing, right against a person	First known in the Brachylogus, a 12th-century work purporting to give ancient Roman iura but in fact containing the iura of mediaeval kingdoms and other institutions, whose official language was Latin. There is no trace of it in antiquity. The source is believed to have been canon law. Subsequently, it became a staple of civil law in the many nations descending from the Roman Empire.	The right to undertake an action against a person to compel performance of an obligated service or delivery of an owed thing. The Romans would have accomplished the same result with other iura, typically under criminal law, as in a punitive action brought against a magistrate for non-performance of obligations.
ius Aelianum	the jurisprudence of Aelius	Not a ius, body of iura, or any type of law or any other public enactment, this phrase is the title of a missing and otherwise unknown book written under the Roman Republic.	Nothing more is known of the book than that Sextus Aelius Paetus Catus, consul in 198 BC, wrote it in three parts: the laws of the Twelve Tables, an interpretation, and some cases (actiones), on which account the book was also called the Tripertita. Which if either name was original remains unknown. Whether the cases concerned the tables or were new in form or content, or just what the significance of the book in Roman jurisprudence was, are purely speculation, as no other evidence exists.
ius aesneciae	principle of the first born	Primogeniture was unknown to the Romans of the classical and imperial periods. It was not a right, law or legal principle associated with Rome in any way. It was a principle applied to the inheritance of some fiefs among Germanic tribes in the Middle Ages and assigned the legal Latin term ius in modern times.	Late Latin aesnecia or aesnetia, anglicised to aesnecy or esnecy was the condition of being the eldest born of either sex, from Old French aisne < ainznez, the condition of being ainz, first (born), as opposed to secunz. Although Bede remarked that the Saxons before the conquest of Britain recognized the eldest son as the head of the family and gave him preference in inheritance, primogeniture was not made a principle of legislation until the Holy Roman Empire, when it was necessary to classify estates as divisible and non-divisible. The latter were maintained intact to support the army. They must therefore be inherited by one person (the knight), the elder by custom.
ius albanagii or ius albinatus	right of alien inheritance	Although this right originated in the Holy Roman Empire and existed in other reflex states, such as Bremen, it was used primarily in early France, where it became the droit d'aubaigne, droit d'aubaine or droit d'aubenage.	Late Latin albinatus, "alien" and albanagium, "state of being an alien," derived from the word for alien, a person from outside the kingdom residing within it (such as a merchant). In the Frankish Period they were known as Albani, Albini, Alibini, Albanici and Aubani.

- Ius albanagii. The right of confiscation of property of an alien, cf. droit d'aubaine (ius Albinatus).
- Ius Albinatus. In old French law. The droit d'aubaine in France, whereby the king, at an alien's death, was entitled to all his property, unless he had peculiar exemption. Repealed by French laws in June, 1791. cf:

- Albanagium -- In old French law, the state of alienage, of being a foreigner or alien.
- Albanus -- In old French law, a stranger, alien, or foreigner.
- Albinatus -- In old French law, the state or condition of an alien or foreigner.

- Ius angariae. The right of angary, i.e., in international law, the right of a belligerent to seize neutral ships in its territory and use them for transportation, should the need arise. Also, the right of a belligerent to seize, use, or destroy property of neutral states located temporarily in its territory or that of the enemy.
- Ius anglorum. The laws and customs of the West Saxons, in the time of the Heptarchy, by which the people were for a long time governed, and that were preferred before all others.
- Ius aquaeductus. In civil law, the name of a servitude that gives landowners the right to bring water through or from the land of another.

== B ==
- Jus banci. In old English law, the right of bench—the right or privilege of having an elevated and separate seat of judgement, anciently allowed only to the king's judges, who hence were said to administer high justice (summam administrant justitiam.) Blount.
- Jus belli. The law of war—the law of nations, as applied to a state of war, particularly defining rights and duties of the belligerent powers themselves, and of neutral nations. The right of war; those actions that may be done without injustice, in regard to an enemy.

- Jus bellum dicendi. The right of proclaiming war.

== C ==
- Jus canonicum. Canon law
- Ius civile. In Roman law, the laws resulting from statutes and decrees governing the citizenry, as elaborated by the commentators of Roman law. According to the distinction employed by Gaius, the ius civile is the law applied only to Roman citizens; the ius gentium governed foreigners or was applied in cases involving both Romans and foreigners.
- Jus civile. Civil law. The system of law peculiar to one state or people. Inst 1, 2, 1. Particularly, in Roman law, the civil law of the Roman people, as distinguished from the jus gentium. The term is also applied to the body of law called, emphatically, the "civil law."

The jus civile and the jus gentium are distinguished as follows. All people ruled by statutes and customs use a law partly peculiar to themselves, partly common to all men. The law each people has settled on for itself is peculiar to the state itself, and is called jus civile, as being peculiar to that very state. The law that has come to be generally accepted among all men—the law that is guarded among all peoples quite alike—is called the jus gentium, "and all nations use it as if it were the law. The Roman people, therefore, use a law that is partly peculiar to itself, partly common to all men." Hunter, Rom. Law, 38.
But this is not the only, or even the generally accepted, use of the words. What the Roman jurists had chiefly in view when they spoke of jus civile was not local as opposed to cosmopolitan law, but the old law of the city as contrasted with the newer law introduced by the praetor (jus prœtorium, jus honorarium). Largely, no doubt, the jus gentium corresponds with the jus honorarium: but the correspondence is not perfect. Id. 39.
- Jus civile est quod sibi populus constituit. "The civil law is what a people establishes for itself". Inst. 1, 2, 1; Jackson v. Jackson, 1 Johns. (N.Y.) 424, 426.

- Ius civitatus. The right of citizenship; the freedom of the city of Rome. It differs from jus quiritium, which included all the privileges of a free native of Rome. The difference is much the same as between "denization" and "naturalization". Wharton.
- Jus cloacae. In civil law, the right of sewerage or drainage. An easement consisting in the right to have a sewer, or to conduct surface water, through the house or over the ground of one's neighbor. Macheld. Rom. Law, Section 317.
- Ius commune. In civil law, common right; the common and natural rule of right, as opposed to jus singulare. Mackeld. Rom. Law, Section 196.

In English law: the common law, answering to the Saxon folcright, 1. Bl. Comm. 67.

- Jus constitui oportet in his quae ut plurimum accidunt non quae ex inopinato. "Laws ought to be made with a view to those cases that happen most frequently, and not to those that are of rare or accidental occurrence". Dig. 1, 3, 3; Broom, Max. 43.
- Ius consumendi. See Ius abutendi.
- Jus coronae. In English law, the right of the crown, or to the crown; the right of succession to the throne. 1 Bl. Comm. 191; 2 Steph. Comm. 434.
- Jus cudendae monetae. In old English law, the right of coining money. 2 How. State Tr. 118.
- Jus curialitatis. In English law, the right of curtesy. Spelman.

== D ==
- Jus dare. To give or to make the law; the function and prerogative of the legislative department.
- Jus deliberandi. In civil law, the right of deliberating. A term granted by the proper officer at the request of him who is called to the inheritance (the heir), within which he has the right to investigate its condition and to consider whether he will accept or reject it. Mackeld. Rom. Law, § 742; Civ. Code La. art. 1028.
- Jus descendit, et non terra. A right descends, not the land. Co. Litt, 345.
- Jus devolutum. The right of the church of presenting a minister to a vacant parish, in case the patron shall neglect to exercise his right within the time limited by law.
- Jus dicere. To declare the law; to say what the law is. The province of a court or judge. 2 Eden, 29; 3 P. Wins. 485.
- Jus disponendi. The right of disposing (of a thing owned)—an attribute of dominium, or ownership.
- Jus dividendi. The right of disposing of realty by will. Du Cange.
- Jus duplicatum. A double right; the right of possession united with the right of property; otherwise called "droit-droit." 2 Bl. Comm. 199.

== E ==
- Ius edicendi. The right enjoyed by curule magistrates (i.e., aediles, praetors, quaestors and governors of provinces) to make edicts respecting their sphere of jurisdiction ("ius edicere").
- Jus est ars boni et aequi. "Law is the science of what is good and just". Dig. 1, 1, 1, 1; Bract, fol. 2b.
- Jus est norma recti; et quicquid est contra normam recti est injuria. "Law is a rule of right; and whatever is contrary to the rule of right is an injury". 3 Bulst. 313.

== F ==
- Jus et fraus numquam cohabitant. "Right and fraud never dwell together". 10 Coke, 45a. Applied to the title of a statute. Id.; Best, Ev. p. 250, Section 205.
- Ex injuria jus non oritur. "A right does (or can) not rise out of a wrong". Broom, Max. 738. note; 4 Bing. 639.
- Jus falcani. In old English law, the right of mowing or cutting. Fleta, lib. 4, c. 27, § 1.
- Jus feciale. In Roman law, the law of arms, or of heralds. A rudimentary species of international law founded on the rights and religious ceremonies of different peoples.
- Jus fiduciarium. In civil law, a right in trust, as distinguished from jus legitimum, a legal right. 2 Bl. Comm. 328.
- Jus Flavianum. In old Roman law, a body of laws drawn up by Cneius Flavius, a clerk of Appius Claudius, from materials to which he had access. It was a popularization of the laws. Mackeld. Rom. Law §39.
- Jus fluminum. In civil law, the right to the use of rivers. Loce. de Jure Mar. lib. 1, c, 6.
- Jus fodiendi. In civil and old English law, the right of digging on another's land. Inst. 2, 3, 2; Bract. fol. 222.
- Ius fruendi. Another attribute of dominium, or ownership: the right or power to reap fruits or profits, as by harvesting crops or taking rents from property.
- Jus futurum: In civil law, a future right; an inchoate, incipient, or expectant right, not yet fully vested. It may be either jus delatum, when the subsequent acquisition or vesting of it depends merely on the will of the person in whom it is to vest, or jus nondum delatum, when it depends on the future occurrence of other circumstances or conditions. Mackeld. Rom. Law, § 191.

== G ==
- Jus gentium. The law of nations. That law that natural reason has established among all men and which is equally observed among all nations is called the law of nations, "as being the law that all nations use". Inst 1, 2, 1; Dig. 1, 1, 9; 1 Bl. Comm. 43; 1 Kent, Comm. 7; Mackeld. Rom. Law, § 125.

Although this phrase had a meaning in Roman law that may be rendered by our expression "law of nations", it must not be understood as equivalent to what we now call "international law", its scope being much wider. It was originally a system of law, or more properly, equity, gathered by early Roman lawyers and magistrates from the common ingredients in the customs of the old Italian tribes—those being the nations, gentes, whom they had opportunities of observing—to be used in cases where the jus civile did not apply; that is, in cases between foreigners, or between a Roman citizen and a foreigner. The principle upon which they proceeded was that any rule of law common to all the nations they knew of must be intrinsically consonant to right reason, and therefore fundamentally valid and just. From this it was an easy transition to the converse principle, viz., that any rule that instinctively commended itself to their sense of justice and reason must be a part of the jus gentium. And so the latter term came eventually to be synonymous with "equity" (as the Romans understood it.) or the system of praetorian law.
Modern jurists frequently employ the term ius gentium privatum to denote private international law, or that subject that is otherwise styled the "conflict of laws"; and ius gentium publicum for public international law, or the system of rules governing the intercourse of nations with each other as persons.
Ius gentium. In early Roman law, the law followed by all peoples, closely akin to the ius naturale. From this universal sense it was used more specifically to describe the international law that governed Rome’s relationship with other states. Following the works of Gaius, the term was employed more narrowly to represent the law that applied among foreigners, and among Romans and foreigners. Foreigners, and the legal relations of Romans with them, were governed by the ius gentium.

- Ius gladii. The right of the sword; the executory power of the law; the right, power, or prerogative of punishing for crime. 4 Bl. Comm. 177.

== H ==
- Ius habendi. The right to have a thing. The right to be put in actual possession of property. Lewin, Trusts, 585.

ius habendi et retinendi. A right to have and to retain the profits, tithes, and offerings, etc., of a rectory or parsonage.

- Ius haereditatis. The right of inheritance.
- Ius hauriendi. In civil and old English law, the right of drawing water. Fleta, lib. 4, c. 27, 5 1.
- Ius honorarium. The body of Roman law, which was made up of edicts of the supreme magistrates, particularly the praetors.

== I ==
- Ius imaginis. In Roman law the right to use or display pictures or statues of ancestors; somewhat analogous to the right in English law to bear a coat of arms.
- Ius immunitatis. In civil law, the law of immunity or exemption from the burden of public office. Dig. 50, 6.
- Ius in personam. A right against a person; a right that gives its possessor a power to oblige another person to give or procure, to do or not to do, something.
- Ius in re. "a right in a thing"—contrast ius ad rem.

Ius in re propria, denoting full ownership; distinguished from jus in re aliena, a mere easement
Ius in re inhaerit ossibus usufructarii. "A right in the thing cleaves to the person of the usufructuary".

- Ius incognitum. An unknown law. This term is applied by civilians to obsolete laws. Bowyer, Mod. Civil Law. 33.
- Ius individuum. An individual or indivisible right; a right incapable of division. 36 Eng. Law & Eq. 25.
- Ius italicum. A Roman law term descriptive of the aggregate of rights, privileges, and franchises possessed by the cities and inhabitants of Italy, outside of the city of Rome, and afterwards extended to some of the colonies and provinces of the empire, consisting principally in the right to have a free constitution, to be exempt from land tax, and to have title to land regarded as Quiritian property. See Gibbon, Rom. Emp. c. xvii; Mackeld. Rom. Law, § 43.

Jus jurandi forma verbii differt, re convenit; hunc enim sensum habere debet: ut Deus invecetur. Grot, de Jur. В., 1. 2, e. 13, § 10. "The form of taking an oath differs in language, agrees in meaning; for it ought to have this sense: that the Deity is invoked."

== L ==
- Ius Latii. In Roman law, the right of Latium or of the Latins. The principal privilege of the Latins seems to have been the use of their own laws, and their not being subject to the edicts of the praetor, and that they had occasional access to the freedom of Rome, and to participate in her sacred rites. Butl. Нor. Jur. 41.
- Ius Latium. A rule of law applicable to magistrates in Latium.
- Ius legitimum. A legal right in civil law. A right that was enforceable In the ordinary course of law. 2 Bl. Comm. 328.

== M ==
- Ius mariti. The right of a husband; especially the right that a husband acquires to his wife's movable estate by virtue of the marriage. 1 Forb. Inst. pt. 1, p. 63.
- Ius merum. In old English law, mere or bare right; the mere right of property in lands, without either possession or even the right of possession. 2 Bl. Comm. 197; Bract fol. 23.

== N ==
- Ius naturae. Literally, “the law of nature”. In Roman law, a near synonym for ius naturale—a law that is supported by natural reason, and so a law that is, or ought to be, respected by the laws of all nations. Thus, the ius naturae was said to support the ius gentium in its universal sense. However, even this relationship is not always congruent: famously, in the introduction to Justinian's Institutes, slavery is forbidden by nature but allowed by the ius gentium. Even so, there was the general sense, seized on increasingly from Roman writings throughout the Renaissance and early modern age, that civil law was to reflect the obligations of natural law, especially when natural law required freedom.
- Ius naturale. The natural law, or law of nature; law or legal principles, supposed to be discoverable by the light of nature or abstract reasoning, or to be taught by nature to all nations and men alike; or law supposed to govern men and peoples in a state of nature i.e., in advance of organized governments or enacted laws. This conceit originated with the philosophical jurists of Rome, and was gradually extended until the phrase came to denote a supposed basis or substratum common to all systems of positive law, and hence to be found, in greater or less purity, in the laws of all nations. And, conversely, they held that if any rule or principle of law was observed in common by all peoples with whose systems they were acquainted, it must be a part of the ius naturale, or derived from it. Thus the phrases "ius naturale" and "ius gentium" came to be used interchangeably.

As the Roman jurist Ulpian said, “that which nature has taught all animals”. For most writings of classical Roman law, synonymous with ius naturae. From the writings of Paul, however, the term ius naturale acquired the sense of an ideal of law, quod semper est bonum et aequum—those actions that are always fair and just. This sense is followed in the Thomist conceptions of natural law, or lex naturalis.

ius naturale est quod apud homines eandem habet potentiam. "Natural right is that with the same force among all mankind". 7 Coke, 12.

- Ius navigandi. The right of navigating or navigation; the right of commerce by ships or by sea. Locc. de Jure Mar. lib. 1, c. 3.
- Ius necis. In Roman law, the right of death, or of putting to death. A right a father anciently had over his children.
- Jus non habenti tute non paretur. "One who has no right cannot be safely obeyed". Hob. 146.
- Jus non patitur ut Idem bis solvatur. "Law does not suffer that the same thing be twice paid".
- Ius non scriptum. The unwritten law, customary law. Inst. 1, 2, 9. 1 Bl. Comm. 64.
- Ius offerendi. In Roman law, the right of subrogation, that is, the right of succeeding to the lieu and priority of an elder creditor on tendering or paying into court the amount due to him. See Mackeld. Rom. Law, § 355.

== P ==
- Ius papirianum. The civil law of Sextus Papirius. The title of the earliest collection of Roman leges curiatae, said to have been made in the time of Tarquin, the last of the kings, by a pontifex maximus of the name of Sextus or Publius Papirius. Very few fragments of this collection now remain, and their authenticity has been questioned. Mackeld. Rom. Law, § 21.
- Ius pascendi. In civil and old English law, the right of pasturing cattle. Inst. 2, 3, 2; Bract, fols. 53&, 222.
- Ius patronatus. In English ecclesiastical law, the right of patronage; the right of presenting a clerk to a benefice. Blount.

A commission from the bishop, where two presentations are offered upon the same avoidance, directed usually to his chancellor and others of competent learning, who are to summon a jury of six clergymen and six laymen to inquire into and examine who is the rightful patron. 3 Bl. Сomm. 246; 3 Steph. Comm. 517.

- Ius pecuniae. The rule of money.
- Ius personarum. Rights of persons. Those rights that, in civil law, belong to persons as such, or in their different characters and relation; as parents and children, masters and servants, etc.
- Ius poenitendi. In Roman law, the right of rescission or revocation of an executory contract on failure of the other party to fulfill his part of the agreement. See Mackeld. Rom. Law, § 444.
- Ius portus. In maritime law, the right of port or harbor.
- Ius possessionis. The right of possession.
- Ius possidendi. One of the attributes of dominium, or ownership: the right or power to possess property.
- Ius postliminii. In civil law, the right of postliminy, i.e., the right or claim of a person who had been restored to the possession of a thing, or to a former condition, to be considered as though he had never been deprived of it. Dig. 49, 15, 5; 3 Bl. Conim. 107, 210.

In international law, the right by which property taken by an enemy and recaptured or rescued from him by the fellow-subjects or allies of the original owner is restored to the latter upon certain terms. 1 Kent, Cornm. 108.

- Ius praesens. In civil law a present or vested right; a right already completely acquired. Mackeld. Rom. Law, §191.
- Ius praetorium. In civil law, the discretion of the prietor, as distinct from the leges, or standing laws. 3 Bl. Comm. 49. That kind of law the praetors introduced for the purpose of aiding, supplying, or correcting the civil law for the public benefit. Dig. 1, 1, 7. Also called jus honorarium.
- Ius precarium. In civil law, a right to a thing held for another, for which there is no remedy by legal action, but only by entreaty or request. 2 Bl. Comm. 328.
- Ius presentationis. The right of presentation.
- Ius privatum. Private law; the law regulating the rights, conduct, and affairs of individuals, as distinguished from "public" law, which relates to the constitution and functions of government and the administration of criminal justice. See Mackeld. Rom. Law. 124. Also private ownership, or the right, title, or dominion of a private owner, as distinguished from ius publicum, which denotes public ownership, or the ownership of property by the government, either as a matter of territorial sovereignty or in trust for the benefit and advantage of the general public. In this sense, a state may have a double right in given property, e.g., lands covered by navigable waters within its boundaries, including both ius publicum, a sovereign or political title, and ius privatum, a proprietary ownership. See Oakland v. Oakland Water Front Co., 118 Cal. 160, 50 Pac. 277.
- Ius prohibendi. An attributes of dominium, or ownership: the right or power to prohibit others from using property, whether by possession alone or by growing or harvesting crops or using or taking rents from the property.
- Ius projiciendi. In civil law, the name of a servitude that consists in the right to build a projection, such as a balcony or gallery, from one's house in the open space belonging to one's neighbor, but without resting on his house. Dig. 50, 10, 242; Id. 8, 2, 2; Mackeld. Rom. Law, § 317.
- Ius proprietatis. The right of property, as distinguished from the ius possessionis, or right of possession. Bract, fol. 3. Called by Bracton "jus merum," the mere right Id.; 2 Bl. Comm. 197; 3 Bl. Comm. 19, 176.
- Ius protegendi. In civil law, the name of a servitude. It is a right by which a part of the roof or tiling of one house is made to extend over the adjoining house. Dig. 50, 16, 242, 1; Id. 8, 2, 2П; Id. 8, 5, 8, 5.
- Ius publicum. Public law, or the law relating to the constitution and functions of government and its officers and the administration of criminal justice. Also public ownership, or the paramount or sovereign territorial right or title of the state or government. See Jus Privatum.

Jus publicum et privatum quod ex naturalibus praeceptis aut gentium aut civilibus est collectum; et quod in jure scripto jus appellatur, id in lege Angliae rectum esse dicitur. Co. Litt. 185. "Public and private law is collected from natural principles, either of nations or in states; and in the civil law is called 'ius', In the law of England it is said to be 'right' ".
Jus publicum privatorum pactis mutari non potest. "A public law or right cannot be altered by the agreements of private persons".

== Q ==
- Ius quaesitum. A right to ask or recover; for example, in an obligation there is a binding of the obligor, and a jus quaesitum in the obligee. 1 Bell, Comm. 32:!.
- Ius Quiritium. The old law of Rome, that was applicable originally to patricians only, and, under the Twelve Tables, to the entire Roman people, was so called. In contradistinction to the ius praetorium, or equity. Brown.

ius quo universitatis utuntur est idem quod habent privati. "The law that governs corporations is the same that governs individuals". Foster v. Essex Bank, 16 Mass. 265, 8 Am. Dec. 135.

== R ==
- Ius recuperandi. The right of recovering (land).
- Ius reformandi. The right of reform, right of reformation.
- Ius relictae. In Scotch law, the right of a relict; the right or claim of a relict or widow to her share of her husband's estate, particularly the movables. 2 Kames, Eq. 340; 1 Forb. Inst. pt. 1, p. 67.
- Ius representationis. The right of representing or standing in the place of another, or of being represented by another.
- Ius rerum. The law of things. The law regulating the rights and powers of persons over things; how property is acquired, enjoyed, and transferred.
- Ius respicit aequitatem. "Law regards equity". Co. Litt 24b; Broom, Max. 151.

== S ==
- Ius scriptum. In Roman law, written law. Inst. 1, 2, 3. All law that was actually committed to writing, whether it had originated by enactment or by custom, in contradistinction to such parts of the law of custom as were not committed to writing (see ius non scriptum). Mackeld. Rom. Law, § 126.

In English law, written law, or statute law, otherwise called "lex scripta", as distinguished from the common law, "lex non scripta". 1 Bl. Comm. 62.

- Ius singulare. In civil law, a peculiar or individual rule, differing from the ius commune, or common rule of right, and established for some special reason. Mackeld. Rom. Law, §196.
- Ius stapulae. In old European law, the law of staple, the right of staple. A right or privilege of certain towns of stopping the transport of merchandise en route and requiring that it be offered for sale in their own markets. Locc. de Jure Mar. lib. 1, c. 10.
- Ius strictum. "Strict law"; law interpreted without any modification, and in its utmost rigor.
- Jus superveniens auctori accrescit sueccessori. "A right growing to a possessor accrues to the successor". Halk. Lat. Max. 76.

== T ==
- Ius tertii. The right of a third party. A tenant, bailee, etc., who pleads that the title is in some person other than his landlord, bailor, etc., is said to set up an ius tertii.

Ius testamentorum pertinet ordinario. Y. B. 4 Hen. VII., 13b. "The right of testaments belongs to the ordinary".

- Ius tripertitum. In Roman law., a name applied to the Roman law of wills, in the time of Justinian, on account of its threefold derivation, viz., from the praetorian edict, from the civil law, and from the imperial constitutions. Maine, Anc. Law, 207.

Jus triplex est—proprietatis, possessionis, et possibilitatis. "Right is threefold—of property, of possession and of possibility".

- Ius trium liberorum. In Roman law, a right or privilege allowed to the parent of three or more children. 2 Kent Comm. 85; 2 Bl. Comm. 247. These privileges were exemption from the trouble of guardianship, priority in bearing offices, and a triple allowance of grain. Adams, Rom. Ant. (Am. Ed.) 227.

== U ==
- Ius utendi. The right to use property without destroying its substance. Employed in contradistinction to ius abutendi.

== V ==
- Ius venandi et piscandi. The right of hunting and fishing.
- Ius vendit quod usus approbavit. "The law dispenses what use has approved". Ellesm. Postn. 35.
- jusjurandum - Lat. An oath.

jusjurandum inter alios factum nec nocere nec prodesse debet. "An oath made between others ought neither to hurt nor profit". 4 Inst. 279.

== See also ==
- Canon law (Catholic Church)
- Corpus Juris Civilis
- Imperator
- Lady Justice
- Lex (disambiguation)
- Praetor
- Roman Law
- Visigothic Code
