= Bocking =

Bocking or Böcking may refer to:

- Bocking, Essex, a village near Braintree, Essex, England
- Bocking 14, a cultivated strain of the plant Comfrey
- Powerbocking, the use of powered stilts patented by Alexander Böck
- Adolf Böcking (1831–1898), German-born ornithologist
- Bill Bocking (1902–1985), English footballer
- Edward Bocking (died 1534), English monk during the reign of King Henry VIII
- Eduard Böcking (1802–1870), German legal scholar
- Henry Bocking (1835–1907), English cricketer
- Kai Böcking (born 1964), German television presenter
- Ralph Bocking (died 1270), English Dominican
- Richard Bocking (1931–2012), Canadian filmmaker
- Stuart Bocking (born 1969), Australian radio presenter
