= Fructus (Roman law) =

Fructus (Latin for "fruits") is a legal term used in Roman law to describe goods naturally created by other property. In the most traditional understanding, this encompasses literal fruit of various plants, but also goods taken from animals such as milk or wool. There is some debate whether profits arising from other legal actions, such as loan interest, can be considered fructus – ancient jurisprudents usually strayed from such interpretations, but did argue to treat such profits in analogical ways.

== Right to fructus ==
In ancient Rome, right to collect fructus was considered an integral right of the owner. Ancient jurisprudents often commented on the right to fructus in various situations. It was generally agreed on that until separation from its core object, fructus remained a part of that object; upon disconnection, they became property of the owner under normal conditions. There existed various exceptions to that general rule:

- A person possessing the object in good faith may be entitled to all fructus collected during their time possessing the property, as a form of reward for "cultivation and care" (pro cultura et cura).
- As part of ususfructus (see below).
- As part of an emphyteusis agreement.
- A detentor might be entitled to fructus if the relevant contract stipulates it.

The exact moment in time in which the ownership of fructus is ascertained differs in certain circumstances. The core object's owner, good faith possessor or emphyteuta all take ownership of fructus in the moment they disconnect from the core object (separatio), while detentors and persons benefiting from ususfructus take ownership in the moment they collect the fructus (perceptio). This becomes important when considering, for example, questions of inheritance.

== Ususfructus ==
Ususfructus is a type of Roman servitude wherein a person is granted the right to use another's property and to collect fructus from another's property. This was a very powerful servitude to give, as in most cases it left the owner only with bare ownership (nuda proprietas) of said property, therefore ususfructus was unable to be inherited or otherwise transferred to another person – it expired with the death of the user or at the time stipulated in the contract. Importantly, such users may not impact or destroy the substance of the property in the course of their use and collection – a stipulation, cautio usufructuaria, was created for the purpose of preventing such abuses.
