= Ex aequo et bono =

Latin maxim

Ex aequo et bono (Latin for "according to the right and good" or "from equity and conscience") is a Latin phrase that is used as a legal term of art. In the context of arbitration, it refers to the power of arbitrators to dispense with application of the law, if appropriate, and decide solely on what they consider to be fair and equitable in the case at hand. However, a decision ex aequo et bono is distinguished from a decision on the basis of equity (equity intra legem) and even tribunals with ex aequo et bono powers generally consider the law too. "Whereas an authorisation to decide a question ex aequo et bono is an authorisation to decide without deference to the rules of law, an authorisation to decide on a basis of equity does not dispense the judge from giving a decision based upon law, even though the law be modified".

Article 38(2) of the Statute of the International Court of Justice (ICJ) provides that the court may decide cases ex aequo et bono only if the parties agree. In 1984, the ICJ decided a case using "equitable criteria" in creating a boundary in the Gulf of Maine for Canada and the US. This was not, however, in relation to Art. 38(2) which has never been invoked by the parties in a dispute before the ICJ. It was an example of referring to 'equity' as a general principle of law under Art. 38 (1) (c).

Article 33 of the United Nations Commission on International Trade Law's Arbitration Rules (1976) provides that the arbitrators shall consider only the applicable law unless the arbitral agreement allows the arbitrators to consider ex aequo et bono, or as amiable compositeur, instead. This rule is also expressed in many national and subnational arbitration laws such as section 22 of the Commercial Arbitration Act 1984 (NSW). It is also embodied under Section 28(2) of the Indian arbitration law - Arbitration & Conciliation Act, 1996 ("The arbitral tribunal shall decide ex aequo et bono or as amicable compositeur only if the parties have expressly authorised it to do so")

On the other hand, the constituent treaty of the Eritrea–Ethiopia Claims Commission explicitly forbids the body from interpreting ex aequo et bono.

Ex aequo et bono powers are occasionally granted to investor-state tribunals deciding disputes between states and foreign investors, such as in Benvenuti & Bonfant v Republic of the Congo.

== Ex aequo ==
The phrase ex aequo (without et bono) is used to mean "equally placed", often in the context of competition winners.

== See also ==
- Equity (law) – similar concept in common law jurisdictions
- Ius strictum – opposite concept in Roman law
- Lex mercatoria
