= Ius abutendi =

Ius abutendi (or abusus), a term in civil law and Roman law, is one of the three major subsets in the bundle of rights making up ownership (dominium), best translated as the ‘right of disposal’. By this phrase is understood the right to dispose of property, i.e. by alienation, inheritance, or otherwise, or "the right to destroy or use up the res altogether."

== See also ==
- Ius
- Ius utendi
