= ABSA v Sweet =

South African legal case

ABSA Bank Ltd v Sweet and Others is an important case in the law of contract in South Africa. It was heard in the Cape Provincial Division May 12, 1992, by Tebbutt J, who delivered judgment on June 19.

== Facts ==
The first respondent, Sweet, had on August 3, 1990, made an offer to purchase certain property from its owner. The offer was accepted on August 10. It was a condition of the offer that it "includes all existing tenancies." The second respondent was a tenant, having been in occupation in terms of an oral lease since 1988. On August 15, 1990, the second respondent signed a written lease with the first respondent in respect of the premises. This lease, however, was subject to a suspensive condition, clause 15(i): The lease was "to be confirmed by the lessor within 14 days after registration in the lessor's name."

On October 5, one "V," on behalf of Sweet, applied to ABSA for a loan of R180,000 against the security of a first mortgage bond over the premises. In the application form, "V" declared that the particulars set out therein, to the best of his knowledge and belief, were true and correct, and that no information which might have affected bank's decision had been withheld. In response to a question in the application as to who would occupy the premises, "V" replied that it would be occupied by Sweet. In the space opposite the question "if tenanted, monthly rental?", the letters "N/A" appeared. "V" also agreed on behalf of Sweet that the latter would be bound by the bank's "standard conditions for mortgage loans," one of which was contained in the mortgage bond and provided that the "mortgagor agrees that the mortgaged property shall not be let for a longer period than one month without the written consent of" the bank. The loan application was granted.

On November 16, the premises were transferred to Sweet and the mortgage bond was registered. On November 20, Sweet endorsed on the lease, as contemplated by clause 15(i), the words "confirmed on 20/11/90." Sweet failed to fulfill her obligations under the mortgage bond, so that, on September 19, 1991, the premises were sold by auction in execution of a judgment obtained by the bank against her. Clause 5 of the conditions of sale provided that the "property shall be sold subject to any existing tenancy. If the amount so realized is insufficient to meet the amount owing to the execution creditor, then the property shall be sold free of any tenancy entered into after the registration of the bond."

The bank purchased the property at the sale in execution for an amount which was less than the bond indebtedness of Sweet to the bank. The sheriff thereupon endorsed on the conditions of sale that, "in terms of clause 5 above, the property was sold free of any alleged leases." The bank thereupon applied in a Provincial Division, inter alia, for the ejectment of the second respondent from the premises. The second respondent, in opposing the application, relied on the written lease with Sweet, contending that the sale of the premises to the bank at the sale in execution was subject to her tenancy in terms of the written lease, such lease having been concluded prior to the sale of the property to the bank and prior to the registration of the bond.

== Principles ==
While the mutual rights of the parties to a contract which is subject to a suspensive condition relate back to the date of the contract where the suspensive condition is fulfilled, the third-party rights, which may have been acquired in good faith, pending the fulfillment of the suspensive condition, are not prejudiced by such retroactive operation of the contract.

== Judgement ==
The court held that, having regard to the fact that the contract of lease was subject to the suspensive condition contained in clause 15(i), and therefore imperfectum or inchoate until the condition was fulfilled, the real right of the bank as mortgagee, created by the registration of the mortgage bond over the premises, ranked in preference to the real right of the second respondent as lessee. The second respondent's right was deemed to have come into existence retroactively or in accordance with the fiction of retroactivity, but it was not established until the suspensive condition had been fulfilled: Until then it was uncertain, whereas the bank's right as mortgagee was firmly and certainly established when the bond was registered.

As the rights of the bank, as a third party in relation to the lease, were not prejudiced by the retroactive operation of the lease brought about by the fulfilment of the suspensive condition, the consequences of a lease subsequent in time to the mortgage bond followed. As the highest bid, when the premises were sold in execution, did not cover the mortgage debt, the property was correctly sold free of the lease. The court held further that there was no basis for holding that the bank knew of the existence of the lease at the time the mortgage was entered into, and that, accordingly, the bank was entitled to an order for the ejectment of the second respondent.

== See also ==
- South African contract law
