= Ius utendi =

Term in civil law and Roman law

Ius utendi (or usus), a term in civil law and Roman law, is an attribute of ownership (dominium): the right or power to use the property—particularly by residing there—without destroying its substance. It is employed in contradistinction to the ius abutendi, the right of disposal.

== See also ==
- Ius
- Ius abutendi
