= Usufruct =

Legal right to use something without altering it

Usufruct (from Latin: usus fructus) is a limited real right (or in rem right) found in civil law and mixed jurisdictions that unites the two property interests of usus and fructus:

- Usus ('use', as in usage of or access to) is the right to use or enjoy a thing possessed, directly and without altering it.
- Fructus ('fruit', as in the fruits of production) is the right to derive profit from a thing possessed: for instance, by selling crops, leasing immovables or annexed movables, taxing for entry, and so on.

A usufruct is either granted in severalty or held in common ownership, as long as the property is not damaged or destroyed. The third civilian property interest is abusus (literally 'abuse'), the right to alienate the thing possessed, either by consuming or destroying it (e.g., for profit), or by transferring it to someone else (e.g., sale, exchange, gift). Someone enjoying all three rights has full ownership.

Generally, a usufruct is a system in which a person or group of persons uses the real property (often land) of another. The "usufructuary" does not own the property, but does have a legally cognizable interest in it, which is sanctioned or contractually granted by the owner. Two different types of usufruct exist: perfect and imperfect. In perfect usufruct, the usufructuary is entitled to the use of the property but cannot substantially change it. For example, an owner of a house can grant a usufruct to a resident; the resident could live in (use) the house, but could not (without the owner's assent) renovate it or tear it down and build a bigger house.

An imperfect usufruct gives the usufructuary some rights to modify the property. For example, if a land owner grants a piece of land to a usufructuary for agriculture, the usufructuary may be given the right to make improvements for agricultural purposes such as building a barn or laying irrigation pipes. This, however, may be ill-advised for the usufructuary inasmuch as they do not own whatever improvements they make and have no claim against the owner for their value, unless this is specifically laid out in the contract creating the usufruct.

In many cases of tenure by usufruct, such as the ejido system in Mexico, individuals or groups may only acquire the usufruct of the property, not legal ownership. Usufructs are similar in nature to common-law life estates, save that a usufruct can be granted for a specified term rather than for life.

== History ==
Usufruct comes from civil law, under which it is a subordinate real right (ius in re aliena) of specified duration, usually for a person's lifetime. The holder of a usufruct, known as the usufructuary, has the right to use (usus) the property and enjoy its fruits (fructus). In modern terms, fructus more or less corresponds to the profit derived, as when selling the "fruits" (in both literal and figurative senses) of the land, or leasing homes on the land to tenants.

Fruits refers to any renewable commodity on the property, including (among others) agricultural goods (literal "fruits", hence the name), livestock, goods produced in a factory, or rents from tenants. These may be divided into civil (fructus civiles), industrial (fructus industriales), and natural fruits (fructus naturales), the latter of which, in Roman law, included slaves and livestock.

Under Roman law, usufruct was a type of personal servitude (servitutes personarum), a beneficial right in another's property. The usufructuary never had possession (in the legal sense) of the property (on the basis that if he possessed at all, he did so through the owner), but did have an interest in the property itself for the specified period (either a set term or a lifetime). Unlike the owner, the usufructuary did not have a right of alienation (abusus), but could sell or lease the usufructuary interest. Even though the usufructary did not hold possessory title, he had a cause of action against infringements on his usufruct rights by a third party, such as theft of goods from the property.

In some now-disused systems of customary law among the indigenous peoples of the Americas, usufruct refers to the legal concept that all land is publicly owned, but individuals and groups can acquire the right to use certain areas, usually for agriculture. Some cultures held this to be similar in concept to a perfect usufruct; one could not damage the land so as to reduce its future productivity. Ancient examples of usufruct are found in the Code of Hammurabi and the Law of Moses. The Law of Moses forbade landowners from harvesting the edges of their fields, and reserved the gleanings for the poor.

Thomas Jefferson wrote in 1789 that "Earth belongs – in usufruct – to the living." Jefferson's metaphor means that, like a usufructuary, human beings have the right to use the earth for their own benefit and derive profit from it, but only to the extent that their actions do not impoverish the earth's bounty for future generations. It was, in other words, an expression both of rights (of the living) and obligations (of the living to those yet to be born). Jefferson's use of the word "living" is critical here: he meant that the usufructuaries of the world are those who are alive, not deceased past generations. This idea would profoundly influence Jefferson over the course of his life, and would lead to his acknowledgement that the Constitution of the United States would be revised by future generations, and was part of the reason that the Constitution includes a provision for its own amendment.

== Local variations ==
=== France ===
In France, usufructs are often created as part of inheritance. Under French law an indefeasible portion known as the forced estate passes to the deceased's surviving spouse and issue (with shares apportioned according to the number of children), with the rest of the estate – the free estate – free to dispose of by will. However, if there is a surviving spouse, they may elect to do one of the following:

1) Distribute the forced estate as is, or convert it into a usufruct

2) Break up the estate into a distributable portion and a usufruct good for the children's lifetime.

If a usufruct is chosen, a value is set for the usufruct interest for inheritance tax purposes and payable by the surviving spouse, with regard to their age. The value of movable property associated with the estate is calculated based on the appraised value of the estate's assets. The value of the surviving spouse's usufruct is subtracted, and whatever balance as remains is divided among the heirs on the death of the surviving spouse. The surviving spouse may do whatever they wish with the movable assets (household items, furniture and the like), with the monetary value of the items going to the children. Title to assets does not pass, and the usufruct is dissolved on death or at the end of a term of years. Trust and usufruct are distinct and subject to different rules. French law is distinct from Roman law in understanding usufructs not as a type of servitude, but rather possessory interests.

=== United States ===
==== Louisiana ====
Although the United States is for the most part a common law jurisdiction, employing life estate for those purposes for which civil law uses usufruct, Louisiana is a hybrid jurisdiction in the French tradition, at least in civil matters. In Louisiana, usufructs are created in a manner similar to other real rights, by gift ("donation"), will ("testament"), or operation of law. Nevertheless, they are typically granted cestui que vie. Unless otherwise provided in a will, a person's share of community property accedes to descendants as bare title holders ("naked owners"); nevertheless, if that person has a living spouse, the latter will receive a usufruct in that portion of the estate until death or remarriage (La. Civil Code art. 890). Under other conditions, the parents of the deceased may acquire similar usufruct rights.

==== Georgia ====
While Georgia does not share Louisiana's civil law history, the Georgia General Assembly created usufructs by statute in 1876. In Georgia, usufruct refers to "rights or privileges usually arising out of landlord and tenant relationships, and with privileges granted to tenants holding less interest in real estate than estate for years". Under Georgia law, if a landowner grants a lease for fewer than five years, it is a usufruct, and the landowner retains the estate. Georgia courts also hold that usufructs are created when the terms of contract between lessor and leaseholder are "so pervasive as to be fundamentally inconsistent with the concept of an estate for years", or where the landowner retains "dominion and control" over a business operating on the property.

=== Philippines ===
Philippine law relating to usufruct is set forth primarily in Title VI of the Philippine Civil Code.

=== Scotland ===
A liferent, the Scots law term for an usufruct, is the right to receive, for one's life, the fruits of an asset (real property or otherwise), without the right to sell it. The holder of such a right is known as the liferenter. The owner of a property burdened by a usufruct is called the fiar and right of ownership is known as the fee.

=== Cuba ===
Historically, prior to the 1959 Cuban Revolution, the Cuban government utilized usufructs to grant long-term commercial and infrastructure concessions to private entities. A notable example was the Port of Havana; beginning in 1905, the government granted a time-limited "usufructuary concession" to build, operate, and profit from the harbor's docks. This agreement granted the corporate concessionaire (ultimately the American-owned Havana Docks Corporation) the exclusive right to possess and receive economic benefits from the terminal facilities for up to 99 years, without transferring the ownership of the underlying land. Following the revolution, these private commercial usufructs were seized and nationalized by the state, a confiscation that later triggered major international litigation under the American Helms–Burton Act.

Post-revolution, usufruct tenure was introduced in Cuba as part of a reorganization of the agricultural sector during the Special Period. As a legacy of sanctions and a struggling economy, Cuba had accumulated many crumbling buildings that could not be repaired. These were torn down and the empty lots lay idle for years until the food shortages forced major changes in Cuban agriculture to increase the efficiency of land use. Initially, this occurred by extralegal agricultural use of abandoned area. Later, usufruct tenure was established, giving farmers rights to product grown on usufruct land on a profit-sharing basis, but not ownership of the land itself.

=== India ===
Usufructuary mortgage in the Indian market denotes a unique property financing arrangement where a mortgage issuer grants an usufruct to a mortgage holder. This distinctive mortgage type integrates property ownership with debt service, granting the mortgagee the right to utilize and derive income from the property. Usufructuary mortgages are common in the agricultural sector; their purpose is to facilitate access to credit for cash-poor farmers whose assets are principally in land. The Indian legal system recognizes and regulates usufructary mortgages.

== In social ecology ==
Usufruct is a central concept in social ecology. Murray Bookchin defines usufruct informally as

The freedom of individuals in a community to appropriate resources merely by virtue of the fact that they are using them

Bookchin contrasts Usufruct with other property relations, saying:

Usufruct, in short, differs qualitatively from the quid pro quo of reciprocity, exchange, and mutual aid — all of which are trapped within history's demeaning account books with their "just" ratios and their "honest" balance sheets.

He pairs the concept of usufruct with complementarity and the irreducible minimum as core to his ethical world view.

What "civilization" has given us, in spite of itself, is the recognition that the ancient values of usufruct, complementarity, and the irreducible minimum must be extended from the kin group to humanity as a whole.

== See also ==
- Cestui que
- Classical liberalism
- Common ownership
- Dominium
- Dower
- Easement
- Fee simple
- Four Fs (legal)
- Freedom to roam
- Freehold (law)
- Geolibertarianism
- Georgism
- Gleaning
- Leasehold estate
- Minnesota v. Mille Lacs Band of Chippewa Indians
- Mutualism (economic theory)
- Perpetual usufruct
- Profit (real property)
- Right-of-way (railroad)
- Rights of way in England and Wales
- Squatting
- Trover
- Usucaption
