= Ius strictum =

Ius strictum means "strict law", or law interpreted without any modification and in its utmost rigor. It is a very rare term in the materials of classical Roman law. It is really a Byzantine term, occurring in Justinian’s Institutes in reference to the strict actions of the law, primarily describing the rigid limitations of the forms of action available under the law, particularly with older laws. It is often used by later commentators to distinguish it from the moderating influence of the praetors, or judges who expanded the law through actions ex fida bona, or what we would now call equity.

== See also ==
- Ius
- Ius scriptum
- Letter and spirit of the law
- Pardon
