= Latium (disambiguation) =

Latium was the region of ancient Italy in which Rome was situated.

Latium may also refer to:

- Old Latium (Latium vetus), the most ancient section of Latium, tribal area of the Latini
- Latium adiectum, a territory added to Latium vetus by Roman conquest
- Ius Latium, a rule of law applicable to magistrates in ancient Latium
- Latin Settlement, communities in Texas founded by German refugees
- Latium, Texas, a German settlement in Texas
- Latium (1669), a scholarly work by Athanasius Kircher

== See also ==
- Lazio, the modern Italian Region comprising (but not limited to) Latium
