= Ius Latium =

Rule of law applicable to magistrates

ius Latium, in Roman law, was a rule of law applicable to magistrates in Latium. It was either majus Latium or minus Latium,—the majus Latium raising to the dignity of Roman citizen not only the magistrate himself, but also his wife and children; the minus Latium raising to that dignity only the magistrate himself.

== See also ==
- Ius
- Ius Latii
- Ius Quiritium
