= Jus disponendi =

Jus disponendi, in the civil law, refers to the right of disposing (of a thing owned, i.e. it is an attribute of dominium, or ownership). An expression used either:

- generally, to signify the right of alienation, as historically a married woman would be deprived of the jus disponendi over her separate estate;
- specially, in the law relating to sales of goods, where it is often a question whether the vendor of goods has the intention of reserving to himself the jus disponendi; i. e., of preventing the ownership from passing to the purchaser, notwithstanding that he (the vendor) has parted with the possession of the goods.

== See also ==
- Ius
