= Unspoken rule =

Rules that are not written down

Unspoken rules, also called unwritten rules, are behavioral constraints imposed in organizations or societies that are not typically voiced or written down. They usually exist in unspoken and unwritten format because they form a part of the logical argument or course of action implied by tacit assumptions. Examples involving unspoken rules include unwritten and unofficial organizational hierarchies, organizational culture, and acceptable behavioral norms governing interactions between organizational members. These rules typically align with the behaviors of the local majority group and seem normal to them, but can be obscure, invisible, and exclusionary to minority groups.

== Noteworthy examples ==
For example, the captain of a ship is usually expected to be the last to evacuate it in a disaster. Or, as Vince Waldron wrote, "A pet, once named, instantly becomes an inseparable member of the family".

Harvard Business Review considers it good business practice to bring unwritten rules to the surface and document them. Unwritten rules can cause uncertainty and stress for newer employees, and great clarity can improve productivity and profitability.

=== Employment and discrimination ===
In the workplace, some unspoken rules can have a significant impact on one's job satisfaction, advancement opportunities, and career trajectory.

In sports, Scottish football club, Rangers until 1989 had an unwritten rule of not signing any player who was openly Catholic. Yorkshire County Cricket Club also historically had an unwritten rule that cricketers could only play for them if they were born within the historical county boundaries of Yorkshire.

== See also ==
- Shibboleth
- Lex non scripta
- Unenumerated rights
- Unwritten rules of baseball
