= Dositheus Magister =

Dositheus Magister (Ancient Greek: Δωσίθεος) was a Greek grammarian who flourished in Rome in the 4th century AD.

== Life ==
He was the author of a Greek translation of a Latin grammar, intended to assist the Greek-speaking inhabitants of the empire in learning Latin. The translation, at first word for word, becomes less frequent, and finally is discontinued altogether.

The Latin grammar used was based on the same authorities as those of Charisius and Diomedes Grammaticus, which accounts for the many points of similarity. Dositheus contributed very little of his own. Some Greek-Latin exercises by an unknown writer of the 3rd century, to be learnt by heart and translated, were added to the grammar. They are of considerable value as illustrating the social life of the period and the history of the Latin language. Of these Ἑρμηνεύματα ("Interpretamenta"), the third book, containing a collection of words and phrases from everyday conversation (κατημερινὴ ὁμιλία) has been preserved. A further appendix consisted of Anecdotes, Letters and Rescripts of the emperor Hadrian; fables, of Aesop; extracts from Hyginus; a history of the Trojan War, abridged from the Iliad; and a legal fragment, Περὶ ἐλευθερώσεων ("De manumissionibus").

== Editions ==
- Grammatica in Heinrich Keil, Grammatici Latini, vii. and separately (1871)
- Hermeneumata by Georg Götz (1892) (in Gustav Loewe's Corpus glossariorum Latinorum, iii.)
- Eduard Böcking (1832), which contains the appendix (including the legal fragment)

== See also ==
- Karl Lachmann, Versuch der Dositheus (1837)
- Hermann Hagen (classicist), De Dosithei magistri quae feruntur glossis (1877)
