= Ius in re =

Legal right in property

Ius in re, or jus in re, under civil law, more commonly referred to as a real right or right in rem, is a right in property, known as an interest under common law. A real right vests in a person with respect to property, inherent in his relation to it, and is good against the world (erga omnes). The primary real right is ownership (dominium) (freehold, leasehold, commonhold). Whether possession (possessio) is recognized as a real right, or merely as a source of certain powers and actions, depends on the legal system at hand. Subordinate or limited real rights generally refer to encumbrances, rights of use and security interests. The term right in rem is derived from the action given to its holder, an actio in rem. In Latin grammar the action against the thing demands a fourth case. The underlying right itself, ius in re, has a fifth case, as the right rests on, or burdens, the thing. By mistake the common law terminology now uses the fourth case for describing the right itself. Compare jus ad rem.

- jus in re propria – the right of enjoyment (i.e., the right to use the property in any legal manner) which is incident to full ownership of property, and is often used to denote the full ownership or property itself.
- jus in re aliena, or encumbrance, which includes servitudes, security interests, real burdens, land charge, rentcharge, emphyteusis, right of first refusal; land leased by another who holds title of property.

Maxims:

- Ius in re inhaerit ossibus usufructarii: "A real right attaches to the usufructuary".

== See also ==
- Ius
- Property law
