= Perpetual usufruct =

Perpetual usufruct (right of perpetual usufruct, RPU) is the English-language term often used by Polish lawyers to describe the Polish version of public ground lease. It is usually granted for 99 years, but never shorter than 40 years, and enables leasehold use of publicly owned land, in most cases located in urban areas. Although it does not give freehold rights, buildings located on such land can be owned directly by private parties. The Act of the transformation of the right of perpetual usufruct into freehold ownership of real estate of 29 July 2005 (Dz.U. 2005 nr 175 poz. 1459) made the transformation possible in specific cases.

== See also ==
- Emphyteusis
