= Jus ad rem =

Jus ad rem is a Latin term of the civil law, meaning "a right to a thing:" that is, a right exercisable by one person over a particular article of property in virtue of a contract or obligation incurred by another person in respect to it and which is enforceable only against or through such other person. It is thus distinguished from jus in re which is a complete and absolute dominion over a thing available against all persons.

The disposition of contemporary civil law jurists is to use the term jus ad rem as descriptive of a right without possession, and jus in re as descriptive of a right accompanied by possession. Or, in a somewhat wider sense, the former denotes an inchoate or incomplete right to a thing; the latter, a complete and perfect right to a thing.
In canon law jus ad rem is a right to a thing. An inchoate and imperfect right, such as is gained by nomination and institution; as distinguished from jus in re, or complete and full right, such as is acquired by corporal possession.

== See also ==
- Ius
