= Eduard Böcking =

German legal scholar

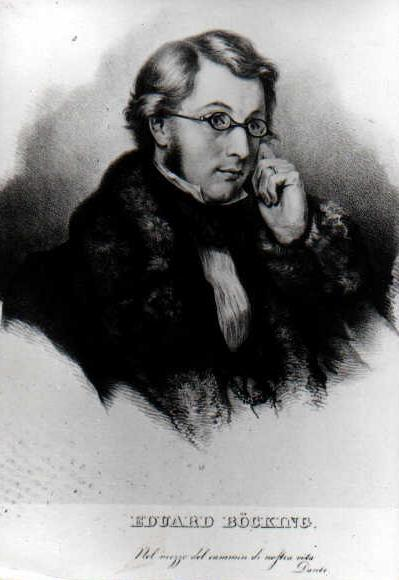
Eduard Böcking.

Eduard Böcking (May 20, 1802 – May 3, 1870) was a German legal scholar. He is best known for his editions of, and commentaries on, the legal works of classical antiquity.

== Life ==
Böcking was born in Trarbach an der Mosel, and attended the gymnasium in Kaiserslautern from 1816 to 1818. He then studied at the universities of Heidelberg, Bonn, Berlin, and Göttingen, and graduated in 1826 with the thesis De mancipii causis at the University of Berlin. In spring 1829 he was appointed extraordinary professor, and moved in the fall to the University of Bonn, where in 1835 he became regular Professor of Law. He died in Bonn in 1870.

His son Adolf Böcking was an ornithologist who moved to the United States of America.

== Works ==
- Translation of and commentary on the Mosella of Ausonius (1828)
- Corpus legum sive Brachylogus (1829)
- Commentary (with Clemens August Carl Klenze) on the Institutiones of Gaius and Justinian (1829)
- Commentary on the Fragmenta of Ulpian (1831)
- Commentary on the Interpretamenta of Dositheus (1832)
- Commentary on the Institutiones of Gaius (1837)
- Critical edition of the Notitia Dignitatum (1839–50, 5 volumes; index 1853)
- Edition of the Moselle River poems of Venantius Fortunatus (1845)
- Edition of the collected German, French, and Latin works of August Wilhelm Schlegel (1846–48, 16 volumes)
- Edition of the collected works of Ulrich von Hutten, entitled Opera quae reperiri potuerunt omnia (1859–62, 5 volumes), with two supplements, Epistolae obscurorum virorum (1864–70), and a bibliographic index, Index bibliographicus Huttenianus (1858)
