= Ius singulare =

Special Roman law

In Roman law, ius singulare (Latin, "singular law") was a special law that applied to a certain class of persons, such as soldiers or minors, or to an individual, in contrast to ius commune civium Romanorum, the law in common to all Roman citizens. In effect, ius singulare was "a technique for incorporating new rules without having to change the old ones."

Ius singulare generally conferred an advantage to the group or individual singled out. In early Rome, privilegium was a legal enactment that might disfavor an individual or group (the privilegiarii), but in the Imperial era privilegium came to mean "privilege" and was sometimes used as a synonym of ius singulare.

As an example, military campaigning removed personnel from circumstances in the city of Rome that facilitated the procedures for drawing up a last will and testament. They were therefore exempt from the usual requirements, and wills written on the eve of battle could be held as valid.

A ius singulare was meant to advance the public interest as a matter of utility. It required deft jurisprudence that preserved the norms of ius commune so that the exception did not become the rule, with a clear understanding that the ius singulare was contra rationem, contrary to standard legal reasoning and thus not precedent. The principle of ius singulare was one of several techniques, among them a plethora of legal fictions, that enabled Roman law to evolve flexibly without overturning its authoritative texts or challenging the fundamental traditionalism of Roman society.
