= Jus gentium =

Customary law concept within international law

In Roman law and legal traditions influenced by it, ius gentium or jus gentium (Latin for "law of nations" or "law of peoples") is the law that applies to all gentes ("peoples" or "nations"). It was an early form of international law, comprising not a body of statute law or legal code, but the customary law thought to be held in common by all in "reasoned compliance with standards of international conduct".

Ius gentium was regarded as a form of ius naturale, or natural law. Unlike ius civile, it applied to all persons and not only Roman citizens, as the rules of ius gentium could be derived from natural reason as innate in all of mankind.

Following the Christianization of the Roman Empire, canon law also contributed to the European ius gentium. By the 16th century, the shared concept of the ius gentium disintegrated as individual European nations developed distinct bodies of law, the authority of the Pope declined, and colonialism created subject nations outside the West.

== Roman law ==
In classical antiquity, the ius gentium was regarded as an aspect of natural law (ius naturale), as distinguished from civil law (ius civile). The jurist Gaius defined the ius gentium as what "natural reason has established among all peoples":

Every people (populus) that is governed by statutes and customs (leges et mores) observes partly its own peculiar law and partly the common law of all mankind. That law which a people established for itself is peculiar to it and is called ius civile (civil law) as being the special law of that civitas (state), while the law that natural reason establishes among all mankind is followed by all peoples alike, and is called ius gentium (law of nations, or law of the world) as being the law observed by all mankind. Thus the Roman people observes partly its own peculiar law and partly the common law of all mankind.

— Gaius, Institutes 1.1

As a form of natural law, the ius gentium was regarded as "innate in every human being", a view that was consonant with Stoic philosophy. Cicero distinguished between things that are written and those that are unwritten but upheld by the ius gentium or the mos maiorum, "ancestral custom". In his treatise De officiis, he regards the ius gentium as a higher law of moral obligation binding human beings beyond the requirements of civil law. A person driven into exile, for instance, lost his legal standing as a Roman citizen, but was supposed to retain the basic protections extended to all human beings under the ius gentium.

The 2nd-century Roman jurist Ulpian, however, divided law into three branches: natural law, which existed in nature and governed animals as well as humans; the law of nations, which was distinctively human; and, civil law, which was the body of laws specific to a people. Slavery, for instance, was supported by the ius gentium, even though under natural law all are born free (liberi). In this tripartite division of law, property rights might be considered a part of the ius gentium, but not of natural law. Hermogenianus, a Roman jurist of the second half of the 3rd century, described the ius gentium as comprising wars, national interests, kingship and sovereignty, rights of ownership, property boundaries, settlements, and commerce, "including contracts of buying and selling and letting and hiring, except for certain contractual elements distinguished through ius civile". The ius gentium was thus in practice important in facilitating commercial law.

=== War, peace and the gentes ===
The theory and terminology of private law was far more developed among the Romans than that of international law. The earliest form of international law was religious and pertained to the concept of the "just war" (bellum iustum), which should only be undertaken with a ritualized declaration of war by the fetial priests. Foreign ambassadors were protected by the ius gentium, and it was a religious violation to harm an envoy.

While the terms of peace treaties might be said to fall broadly within the ius gentium, there was no framework of international law per se with which a treaty had to conform. As gentes were brought under Roman rule, Roman law became in effect international law. Local laws remained in force as long as they did not come into conflict with Roman law; this compatibility was understood as reflecting the underlying ius gentium. The praetor assigned to foreign affairs (praetor peregrinus) is thought by many scholars to have played an important role in extending Roman civil law to the gentes. Laws originally pertaining to matters of contract law among Roman citizens, such as property transfers and manumission, were thus "internationalized" among the gentes. Questions of "international law" might arise in relation to individual grants of citizenship, and whether these accorded with treaty. Because there was no generally accepted principle of international law, controversy might also arise over whether "Rome was bound by an agreement concluded by a field commander without approval of the Senate—typically an armistice concluded in distress and on unfavourable terms".

A key passage pertaining to what Romans understood as "international law" is presented by Livy, as spoken by an envoy of King Antiochus:

There were three kinds of treaties (foedera, singular foedus), he said, by which states and kings concluded friendships (amicitiae): one, when in time of war terms (leges) were imposed upon the conquered; for when everything was surrendered to him who was the more powerful in arms, it is the victor's right and privilege to decide what of the conquered's property he wishes to confiscate; the second, when states that are equally matched in war conclude peace and friendship on terms of equality; under these conditions demands for restitution are made and granted by mutual agreement, and if the ownership of any property has been rendered uncertain by the war, these questions are settled according to the rules of traditional law or the convenience of each party; the third exists when states that have never been at war come together to pledge mutual friendship in a treaty of alliance; neither party gives or accepts conditions; for that happens when a conquering and a conquered party meet.

=== Terminology ===
Terminology associated with Roman international law was non-specialized but included:

- amicitia, "a relation of friendship without any further concrete engagements, i.e. the mere exclusion of hostilities; ... it could be concluded by a treaty but also without".
- societas, although sometimes a mere synonym for amicitia, is "an obligation to peace and neutrality" with "a duty to grant military support".
- foedus, originally a sacred oath made by a fetial priest on behalf of the Roman people, who will suffer a "self-damnation" if they violate the treaty.
- pax, "both the state of peace and the means to achieve it by treaty".
- indutiae, truces that "do not end the war as a whole, but interrupt the hostilities only temporarily".
- deditio, surrender, with "the inherent normative expectation that the victor would in any case spare the inhabitants' lives".
  - dediticius, a person who became a subject of the Roman Empire through a deditio; dediticii were excluded from the universal citizenship extended to all free inhabitants of the empire under the Constitutio Antoniniana.
- fides, "trustworthiness, loyalty, credibility", was a quality the Romans wanted to pride themselves for upholding, including respect for the law and fides in foreign relations.

== Medieval Europe ==
In the Middle Ages, the ius gentium derived from canon law in addition to Roman legal theory. In late antiquity, Isidore of Seville (c. 560–636), enumerated the principles of the ius gentium, focusing on foedera pacis, "peace treaties":

Ius gentium is occupation, construction, fortification, wars, captivity, the right of regaining citizenship after captivity, slavery, treaties, peace, armistice, the inviolability of ambassadors, the prohibition of mixed marriages; and it is the ius gentium because nearly every nation uses it.

== Early modern Europe ==
In the 16th century, members of the School of Salamanca, including Francisco de Vitoria and Francisco Suárez, wrote of the ius gentium as rules for relations between peoples who did not share common civil law. Vitoria held totus orbis or "consent of the whole world" as paramount to his approach, applying it to questions of travel, commerce, just war, and slavery in the New World, among other topics. He argued that the Indigenous peoples of the Americas had dominium - sovereignty - over their native lands. Later on, Suárez distinguished ius inter gentes (law among nations) from natural law, treating the former as a sort of universal customary law. These ideas went on to influence later modern and contemporary writes such as Hugo Grotius.

== Modern usage ==
In John Rawls' work on The Law of Peoples, he states that his concept of the law of peoples is drawn from the traditional ius gentium. He makes specific reference to the phrase ius gentium intra se: "the law of peoples within themselves".
