= Adolf Böcking =

German-American naturalist

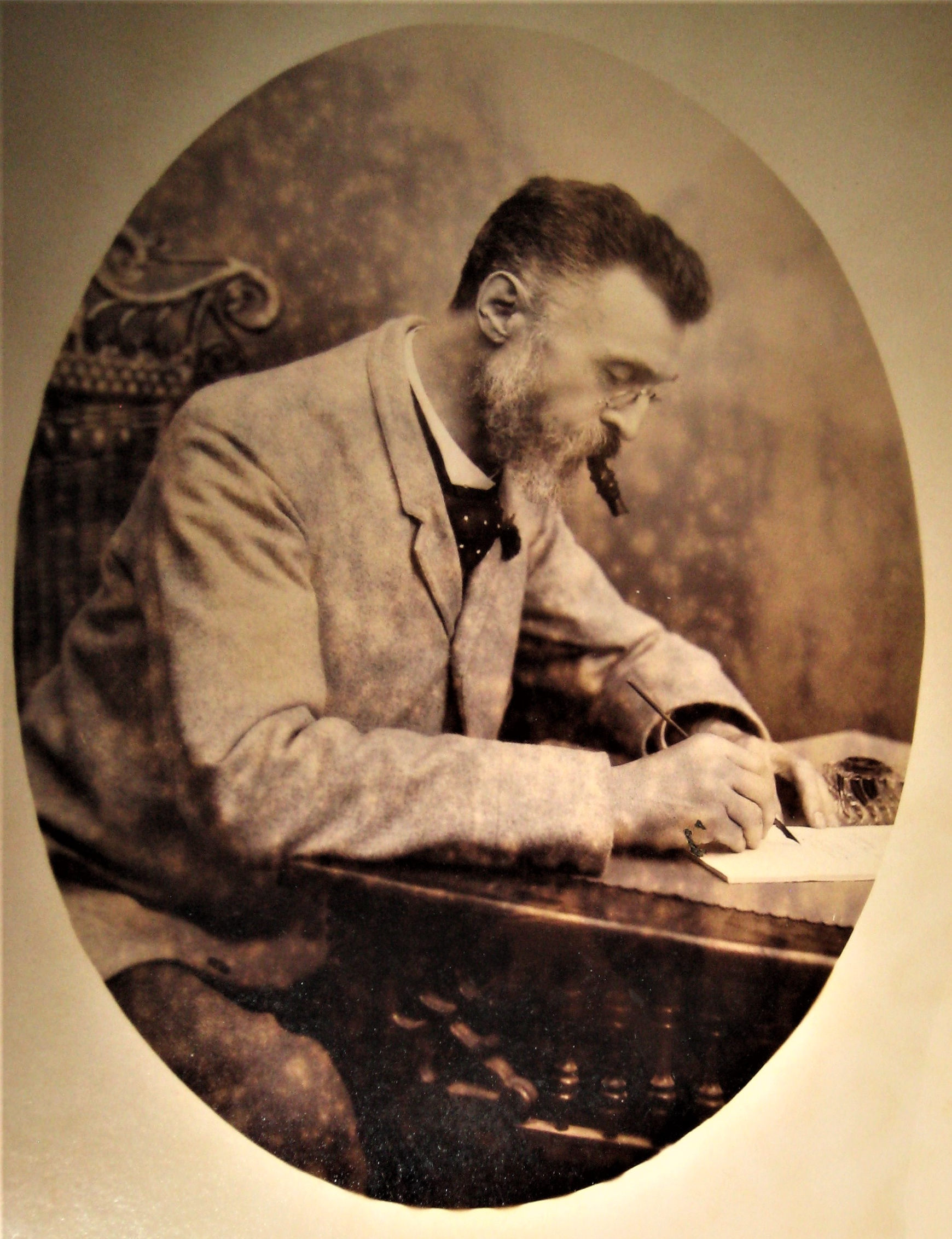
- Böcking in 1892
- Born: 14 June 1831; Bonn, Germany
- Died: 18 April 1898 ( age 66); Comfort, Texas
- Known for: Field Research in Uruguay on Rhea Americana
- Father: Eduard Böcking

Adolf Theodor Erich Böcking (14 June 1831 – 18 April 1898) was a German-born naturalist who settled in the United States. He studied the biology of the Rhea (Rhea americana) also known as the Nandu and was among the first to publish a monograph on the species.

== Life and work ==
Adolf Böcking was born in Bonn, Germany the son of legal scholar professor Eduard Böcking. He studied natural science at the University of Bonn and received his PhD in Zoology in 1863 for a thesis on the Rhea americana or Nandu. In 1860 he traveled to Uruguay in South America to study the fauna on behalf of the Prussian government and where he contracted malaria. Bocking then traveled to America in 1864 to visit his younger brother who was a volunteer in the Union infantry and in a military hospital. Bocking became a naturalized citizen in 1869 and bought a plot of land in Kansas where he built a stone house that he later sold. He traveled to London in 1870 and returned married to Kansas to buy a farm but after several crop failures related to drought and the locust plague of 1874, he decided to give it up in order to protect his family from further hardship. He lived in London with his family but due to poor conditions and health problems exacerbated by the weather he decided to move to warmer climates in Texas where he arrived with his wife and sons in 1886. He was director of the Fredericksburg School but resigned early and moved to San Antonio, Texas, where he wrote for various scientific journals and gave lectures that were well received. He presided over the Scientific Society of San Antonio and the Liberal Association in 1892. Bocking valued freedom and progress and was an outspoken Freethinker. During the summer of 1898 he was found missing and it was only several days later that he was found to have shot himself.

Böcking's major work was a book on the Nandu published by the Scientific Society of San Antonio in 1894 which was based on his thesis.
