= Brachylogus =

Brachylogus (from Greek brachys, short, and Greek logos, word), is a title applied in the middle of the 16th century to a work containing a systematic exposition of the Roman law. Some writers have assigned to the reign of the emperor Justinian I, and others have treated as an apocryphal work of the 16th century.

The earliest extant edition of this work was published at Lyon in 1549, under the title of Corpus Legum per modum Institutionum; and the title Brachylogus totius Juris Civilis appears for the first time in an edition published at Lyon in 1553. The origin of the work may be referred with great probability to the 12th century. There is internal evidence that it was composed subsequently to the reign of Louis le Débonnaire (778–840), as it contains a Lombard law of that king's, which forbids the testimony of a clerk to be received against a layman. On the other hand, its style and reasoning is far superior to that of the law writers of the 10th and 11th centuries; while the circumstance that the method of its author has not been in the slightest degree influenced by the school of the Gloss-writers (Glossatores) leads fairly to the conclusion that he wrote before that school became dominant at Bologna. Savigny, who traced the history of the Brachylogus with great care, is disposed to think that it is the work of Irnerius himself (Geschichte des röm. Rechts im Mittelalter). Its value is chiefly historical, as it furnishes evidence that a knowledge of Justinian's legislation was always maintained in northern Italy. The author of the work has adopted the Institutes of Justinian as the basis of it, and draws largely on the Digest, the Code and the Novels; while certain passages, evidently taken from the Sententiae Receptae of Julius Paulus, imply that the author was also acquainted with the Visigothic code of Roman law compiled by order of Alaric II.
