= Henry Bocking =

English cricketer

Henry Bocking (10 December 1835 – 22 February 1907) was an English first-class cricketer, who played two games for Yorkshire County Cricket Club in 1865.

Born in Sheffield, he made his debut against Surrey at the Oval in August with scant success. Absent in Yorkshire's first innings he made only three in the second, batting at number 10, before being bowled by Mortlock, in a match won by Surrey by five wickets inside two days. His second and final game was against Kent County Cricket Club, at the Bat and Ball Ground in Gravesend, Kent. Both he and his team fared better, with Bocking making eleven before Bennett bowled him, and Yorkshire drawing the game. His services were not called upon again by his county.

Bocking died aged 71 in Sheffield, in February 1907.
