= Ius naturale =

Ius naturale is Latin for natural right, the laws common to all beings. Roman jurists wondered why the ius gentium (the laws which applied to foreigners and citizens alike) was in general accepted by all people living in the Empire. Their conclusion was that these laws made sense to a reasonable person and thus were followed. All laws which would make sense to a normal person were called ius naturale.

Slavery, for example, was part of the empire-wide ius gentium because slavery was known and accepted as a normal social institution in all parts of the known world. Nevertheless, as forcing people to work for others was a human-produced condition, it was not considered natural and, hence, was part of the ius gentium but not the ius naturale. The ius naturale of the Roman jurists is not the same as implied by the modern sense of natural law as something derived from pure reason. As Sir Henry James Sumner Maine puts it, "it was never thought of as founded on quite untested principles. The notion was that it underlay existing law and must be looked for through it". Romans gave to Natural law a great importance in their daily lives. They mentioned once "ius naturale est quod natura omnia animalia docuit", which means the right that nature gave to all living things.

== See also ==
- Roman law
- Ius civile
