= Servitude in civil law =

Legal concept regarding property

A servitude is a qualified beneficial interest severed or fragmented from the ownership of an inferior property (servient estate) and attached to a superior property (dominant estate) or to some person (personal beneficiary) other than the owner. At civil law, ownership (dominium) (e.g. of land) is the only full real right whereas a servitude is a subordinate real right on par with wayleaves, real burdens (i.e. real covenants), security interests, and reservations. There are two types: predial, attaching to property, and personal, attaching to a person.

A servitude cannot impose the performance of a positive duty on the owner of the burdened property but only duties either to refrain from exercising certain rights to which an owner could be otherwise entitled (negative servitude) or to suffer certain things to be done to his property which an owner otherwise could be entitled to forbid or resist (positive servitude). Servitudes arise from express agreement, adverse possession, or as a matter of law.

== Predial servitude ==
A predial (Brit. praedial) servitude is an incorporeal hereditament burdening a servient estate (praedium serviens) for the benefit of a dominant estate (praedium dominans) to protect the holder in his own rights to the use or enjoyment of property. The two estates must belong to different bare title holders (dominus nudea proprietatis, i.e. fee simple owners). This type of servitude may only burden immovable property (i.e. real property). The right is for the benefit of the dominant estate rather than the person and remains in effect upon its transfer, that is, it runs with the land and extends to any owner, whether the original or successor-in-title. Predial servitudes are limited to:

- nonpossessory interests: easements appurtenant, whether public or private.

Predial servitudes are generally characterized as:

- permanent - the interest is effective for as long as ownership continues, that is, in perpetuity or for a fixed term of years;
- accessory - servitudes are inseparable from the dominant estate and run with it, and the property interest cannot be conveyed, leased, or encumbered separately from the dominant estate; and
- indivisible - the servitude burdens the whole servient estate and benefits the whole dominant estate; the servitude runs in benefit of each subdivided estate resulting from the partition of the dominant estate, and this does not result in an additional burden for each subdivision on the servient estate.

When a servient estate exists but the servient owner cannot be determined, and where the law allows, a dominant owner may be granted a servitude right a non domino, i.e. absent the servient owner. In this event, the dominant owner will generally not be indemnified by the land registry for the statutory prescriptive period.

=== Benefitting enclaves ===
Originally, enclave was a term of property law, across much of Europe, particularly seen early in 15th century France derived from earlier ecclesiastical senses, for the situation of a main estate of land or a parcel of land surrounded by land owned by a different owner(s), and that could not be reached for its exploitation in a practical and sufficient manner without crossing the surrounding land. In law, this created a servitude of passage for the benefit of the owner of the surrounded land.

== Personal servitude ==
A personal servitude is an interest that benefits its holder personally or financially with or without the use or enjoyment of property. In this case, there is no dominant estate, only a personal beneficiary, and therefore the servitude is in principle not assignable or inheritable, unless transferability is part of the original grant or results from economic purposes that the servitude is designed to serve. Instead, the servitude moves with a particular person, not with a specific property, and includes:

- easements in gross;
- life interests: rights of use (usus), residence (habitatio), and usufruct;
- limited interests: rights of pre-emption, emption, and redemption.

Napoleonic civil-law countries do not generally recognize personal servitudes. The mixed jurisdictions of Quebec and Louisiana are exceptions due to influence from common law, but under these systems personal servitudes are limited to easements in gross.

== Quebec ==
Under Quebec law, a servitude is a real right excluding third parties and which is created sui generis, by agreement (ex contractu), or by operation of law (ex lege). Quebec Civil Code, article 1177 provides:

A servitude is a charge imposed on an immovable, the servient land, in favour of another immovable, the dominant land, belonging to a different owner. [...]

Quebec law distinguishes between predial and personal servitudes.

- A predial servitude is a perpetual real right in the property of another (the servient estate) which confers on the owner of the dominant estate permanent, specific entitlements of use and enjoyment (beneficial interest) of the servient estate.
- A personal servitude is a limited real right granting the holder specific entitlements of use and enjoyment of an item of movable (personal) or immovable (real) property of another in his personal capacity for a specific period or his lifetime or, in the case of a legal person, for a maximum of 100 years.

== See also ==
- Easement
- Servitude (Roman law)
