= Emphyteusis =

Concept in real estate law

Emphyteusis (Greek, 'implanting') or emphyteutic lease is a contract for land that allows the holder the right to the enjoyment of a property, often in perpetuity, on condition of proper care, payment of tax, and rent. This type of real estate contract specifies that the lessee must improve the property for the nation or for its population, for example through construction of a railway service or by farming the land to create produce, as happened in Mauritius where the population was starving. The term is commonly used in France and its ex-colonies, in Quebec, and in Belgium. This kind of lease is usually associated with government lands or government properties.

== History ==
Emphyteusis originated in Ancient Greece. In the early Roman Empire, it was initially granted by the state for the purposes of agriculture or development. In essence, it was a long-term lease of an imperial domain for a rental in kind. The title existing before emphyteusis was ius in agro vectigali. The emphyteusis gave the lease-holder (emphyteuta) rights similar to those of a proprietor, although the real owner remained the person to whom the rent (canon or pensio) was paid. The tenant gained most of the rights of the owner. Accordingly, he could maintain actio vectigalis in rem against any one to recover possession of the land thus leased. Under certain circumstances, the land returned to the owner, as in the case of the death of the emphyteuta intestate, non-payment of the rent or taxes for three years (or two years in case of land held of the Church), lapse of time if a term was fixed in the original agreement, contractus emphyteuseos, which was a specific contract and neither an ordinary lease nor a sale. The rights of the emphyteuta embraced the full use of the land and its products and were alienable and transferable by testament or ab intestato.

Emphyteusis is still in use in countries such as Sri Lanka, Germany, Belgium, Canada, Portugal, France, Italy, the Netherlands, Malta and Spain and, until relatively recently, in Scotland. Rwanda adopted an emphyteutic leasing system in 2013, offering 99-year leases for agricultural land to its citizens, and 20-year leases for residential land.

== See also ==
- Ground rent
- Leasehold estate
- Perpetual usufruct
