= Lex non scripta =

Latin expression and legal term

Lex non scripta is a Latin expression that means "law not written" or "unwritten law". It is a term that embraces all the laws which do not come under the definition of written law or lex scripta (i.e. statutory law, created by a governing body). It is composed, principally, of the law of nature, the law of nations, the common law, and customary law.

== See also ==
- List of Latin phrases
- Unspoken rule
