= Lex scripta =

Latin idiom

Lex scripta (plural: leges scriptae) is a Latin expression that means "written or statutory law". It is in contrast to lex non scripta, customary or common law. The term originates from the Roman legal tradition. Emperor Justinian divided the lex scripta into several categories:

- Statutes (laws passed by the senate)
- Plebiscita (laws passed by the plebeian council)
- Senatorial decrees
- Decisions of the Emperors
- Orders of the magistrates
- Answers of jurisconsults

Lex scripta has a lasting effect that can define a legal tradition for a culture such as that found in the Corpus Juris Civilis, Magna Carta, Tang Code, or a country's constitution.

== United Kingdom and the United States ==
In the United Kingdom, and later, the United States, Lex Scripta refers to the body of statutory law that amends or changes the common law, especially when effecting common law marriage and other customs. Traditionally, English law, up through the 19th century, was divided into Lex non scripta (common law and customs) and Lex scripta ("written and statute law"), with the Magna Carta being the oldest of the latter.

== See also ==
- List of Latin phrases
