= Roman law =

Law in Ancient Rome (c. 449 BC – AD 529)

Roman law is the legal system of ancient Rome, including the legal developments spanning over a thousand years of jurisprudence, from the Twelve Tables (c. 449 BC), to the Corpus Juris Civilis (AD 529) ordered by Eastern Roman emperor Justinian I.

Roman law also denoted the legal system applied in most of Western Europe until the end of the 18th century. In Germany, Roman law practice remained in place longer under the Holy Roman Empire (963–1806). Roman law thus served as a basis for legal practice throughout Western continental Europe, as well as in most former colonies of these European nations, including Latin America, and also in Ethiopia.

English and Anglo-American common law were influenced also by Roman law, notably in their Latinate legal glossary. Eastern Europe was also influenced by the jurisprudence of the Corpus Juris Civilis, especially in countries such as medieval Romania, which created a new legal system comprising a mixture of Roman and local law.

After the dissolution of the Western Roman Empire, the Roman law remained in effect in the Byzantine Empire. From the 7th century onward, the legal language in the East was Greek, with Eastern European law continuing to be influenced by Byzantine law.

== Development ==
The jurist Sextus Pomponius said, "At the beginning of our city, the people began their first activities without any fixed law, and without any fixed rights: all things were ruled despotically, by kings".

Before the Twelve Tables (i.e between 754 and 449 BC), private law comprised the Roman civil law (ius civile Quiritium) that applied only to Roman citizens and was bonded to religion. The ius civile of the time was undeveloped, with attributes of strict formalism, symbolism, and conservatism, for example, as embodied in the ritual practice of mancipatio. It is believed that Roman law is rooted in the Etruscan religion, emphasizing ritual.

=== Twelve Tables ===
The first legal text of the Roman law is the Law of the Twelve Tables, dating from the mid-fifth century BC. The plebeian tribune, C. Terentilius Arsa, proposed that the law should be written in order to prevent magistrates from applying the law arbitrarily. After eight years of political struggle, the plebeian social class convinced the patricians to send a delegation to Athens to copy the Laws of Solon; they also dispatched delegations to other Greek cities for a like reason.

In 451 BC, according to the traditional story, according to Livy, ten Roman citizens were chosen to record the laws, known as the decemviri legibus scribundis. While they were performing this task, they were given supreme political power (imperium), whereas the power of the magistrates was restricted. In 450 BC, the decemviri produced a set of laws inscribed on ten tablets (tabulae), which were considered unsatisfactory by the plebeians. A second decemvirate is said to have added two additional tablets in 449 BC. The resulting Law of the Twelve Tables was subsequently approved by the people's assembly.

Modern scholars tend to challenge the accuracy of Roman historians. They generally do not believe that a second decemvirate ever took place. The decemvirate of 451 BC is believed to have assumed the leading functions in Rome and included the most controversial points of customary law. Questions concerning Greek influence on early Roman law are still much discussed. Many scholars consider it unlikely that the patricians sent an official delegation to Greece, as the Roman historians believed. Rather, the Romans acquired Greek legislations from the Greek cities of Magna Graecia, the main portal between the Roman and Greek worlds.

The original text of the Twelve Tables has not been preserved. The tablets were probably destroyed when Rome was conquered and burned by the Gauls in 387 BC. The fragments which did survive show that it was not a law code in the modern sense. It did not provide a complete and coherent system of all applicable rules or give legal solutions for all possible cases. Rather, the tables contained specific provisions designed to change the then-existing customary law. Although the provisions pertain to all areas of law, the largest part is dedicated to private law and civil procedure.

=== Early republican law ===
Among the most consequential laws passed during the early Republic were the Lex Canuleia (445 BC), which allowed marriage (conubium) between patricians and plebeians; the Leges Liciinae Sextiae (367 BC), which restricted the amount of public land (ager publicus) that any citizen could occupy, and stipulated that one of the two annual consuls must be plebeian; the Lex Ogulnia (300 BC), which permitted plebeians to hold certain priestly offices as pontiffs or augurs; and the Lex Hortensia (287 BC), which stated that the determinations of plebeian assemblies (plebiscita) would henceforth be binding on the entire populus Romanus, both patricians and plebeians.

Another important statute from the Republican era is the Lex Aquilia of 286 BC, which may be regarded as the root of modern tort law.

== Jurisprudence ==
Rome's most important contribution to European legal culture was not the enactment of well-drafted statutes, but the emergence of a class of professional jurists (prudentes or jurisprudentes, sing. prudens) and of a legal science. This was achieved in a gradual process of applying the scientific methods of Greek philosophy to the subject of law, a subject which the Greeks themselves never treated as a science.

Traditionally, the origins of Roman legal science are connected to Gnaeus Flavius. Around the year 300 BC, Flavius is said to have published the formularies containing the words which had to be spoken in court to begin a legal action. Before the time of Flavius, these formularies are said to have been secret and known only to the priests. Their publication made it possible for non-priests to explore the meaning of these legal texts. Whether or not this story is credible, jurists were active, and legal treatises were written in larger numbers before the 2nd century BC. Among the famous jurists of the republican period are Quintus Mucius Scaevola, who wrote an influential and voluminous treatise on all aspects of the law, and Servius Sulpicius Rufus, a friend of Marcus Tullius Cicero. Thus, Rome had developed a very sophisticated legal system and a refined legal culture when the Roman republic was replaced by the monarchical system of the Principate in 27 BC.

=== Pre-classical period ===
In the period between about 201 to 27 BC, more flexible laws developed to match the needs of the time. In addition to the old and formal ius civile, a new juridical class was created: the ius honorarium: "The law introduced by the magistrates who had the right to promulgate edicts in order to support, supplement or correct the existing law." With this new law the old formalism was abandoned, and more flexible principles of ius gentium ("law of the nations") were used.

The adaptation of law to new needs was given over to juridical practice, to magistrates, and especially to the praetors. Though the praetors were not legislators and did not technically create new law when he issued his edicts (magistratuum edicta), the results of his rulings enjoyed legal protection (actionem dare) and were in effect often the source of new legal rules. A praetor's successor was not bound by the edicts of his predecessor. However, he did take rules from edicts of his predecessor that had proved to be useful. In this way a constant content was created that proceeded from edict to edict (edictum traslatitium).

Thus, over the course of time, parallel to the civil law and supplementing and correcting it, a new body of praetoric law emerged. In fact, praetoric law was so defined by the famous Roman jurist Papinian (142–212 AD): "Ius praetorium est quod praetores introduxerunt adiuvandi vel supplendi vel corrigendi iuris civilis gratia propter utilitatem publicam" ("praetoric law is that law introduced by praetors to supplement or correct civil law for public benefit"). Ultimately, civil law and praetoric law were fused in the Corpus Juris Civilis.

=== Classical Roman law ===
The first 250 years of the current era are the period during which Roman law and Roman legal science reached its greatest degree of sophistication and influence. The law of this period is often referred to as the "classical period of Roman law". The Roman Republic had three different branches: the Assemblies, the Senate, and the Consuls. The assemblies passed laws and made declarations of war; the Senate controlled the treasury; and the consuls had the highest juridical power.

The jurists worked in different functions, including giving legal opinions at the request of private parties; advising magistrates, especially the praetors; and helping the praetors draft their edicts, in which they publicly announced, at the beginning of their tenure, how they would handle their duties, and the formularies, according to which specific proceedings were conducted. Some jurists also held high judicial and administrative offices themselves.

The jurists also produced various legal punishments. Around 130 AD, the jurist Salvius Iulianus drafted a standard form of the praetor's edict, which was used by all praetors from that time onwards. This edict contained detailed descriptions of all cases, in which the praetor would allow a legal action and in which he would grant a defense. The standard edict thus functioned like a comprehensive law code, even though it did not formally have the force of law. It indicated the requirements for a successful legal claim. The edict therefore became the basis for extensive legal commentaries by later classical jurists like Paulus and Ulpian.

During the pre-classical and classical period, such laws emerged as the separation of ownership and possession; contract and tort as distinct sources of obligations; standard types of contracts (sale, contract for work, hire, contract for services) regulated in most continental codes; the Institutes of Gaius, which invented a system of private law based on the division of all material into personae (persons), res (things) and actiones (legal actions). Gaius's system was used for many centuries, and has been recognized in legal treatises like William Blackstone's Commentaries on the Laws of England and enactments like the French Code civil and the German BGB.

=== Post-classical law ===
By the middle of the 3rd century, the conditions for the flourishing of a refined legal culture had become less favourable. The general political and economic situation deteriorated as the emperors assumed more direct control of all aspects of political life. The political system of the Principate, which had retained some features of the republican constitution, began to transform itself into the absolute monarchy of the Dominate. The existence of legal science and of jurists who regarded law as a science, not as an instrument to achieve the political goals set by the absolute monarch, did not fit well into the new order of things. Jurisprudential literary production all but ended. Few jurists after the mid-3rd century are known by name. While legal science and legal education persisted to some extent in the eastern part of the Empire, most of the subtleties of classical law came to be disregarded and finally forgotten in the west. Classical law was replaced by the so-called vulgar law of the late Roman Empire.

=== Byzantine law ===
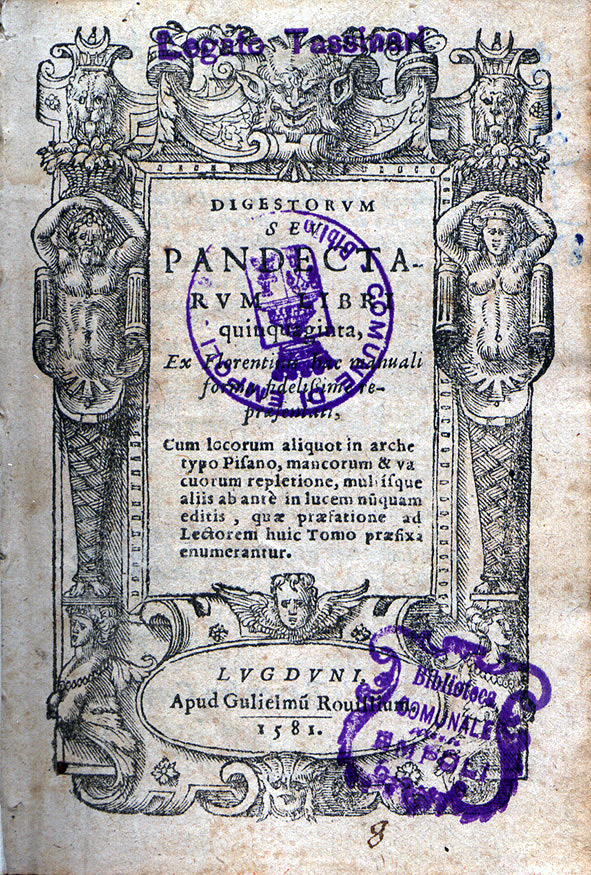
Title page of a late 16th-century edition of the Digesta, part of Emperor Justinian's Corpus Juris Civilis

When the centre of the Empire was moved to the Greek East in the 4th century, many legal concepts of Greek origin appeared in the official Roman legislation. The influence is visible even in the law of persons or of the family, traditionally the part of the law that changes least. For example, Constantine started putting restrictions on the ancient Roman concept of patria potestas, the power held by the male head of a family over his descendants, by acknowledging that persons in potestate, the descendants, could have proprietary rights. He was apparently making concessions to the much stricter concept of paternal authority under Greek-Hellenistic law. The Codex Theodosianus (438 AD) was a codification of Constantian laws. Later emperors went even further, until Justinian finally decreed that a child in potestate became owner of everything it acquired, except when it acquired something from its father.

The codes of Justinian, particularly the Corpus Juris Civilis (529–534) continued to be the basis of legal practice in the Empire throughout its so-called Byzantine history. Leo III the Isaurian issued a new code, the Ekloge ton nomon, in the early 8th century. In the 9th century, the emperors Basil I and Leo VI the Wise commissioned a combined translation of the Code and the Digest, parts of Justinian's codes, into Greek, which became known as the Basilica. Roman law as preserved in the codes of Justinian and in the Basilica remained the basis of legal practice in Greece and in the courts of the Eastern Orthodox Church even after the fall of the Byzantine Empire and the conquest by the Turks, and, along with the Syro-Roman law book, also formed the basis for much of the Fetha Negest, which remained in force in Ethiopia until 1931.

== Substance ==
The basics of Roman law (in German with English captioning)

=== Concept of laws ===
The 2nd-century Roman jurist Ulpian, however, divided law into three branches: natural law, which existed in nature and governed animals as well as humans; the law of nations, which was distinctively human; and, civil law, which was the body of laws specific to a people.

Ius civile ("citizen law", originally ius civile Quiritium) was the body of common laws that applied to Roman citizens and the Praetores Urbani, the individuals who had jurisdiction over cases involving citizens. Ius gentium ("law of peoples") was the body of common laws that applied to foreigners, and their dealings with Roman citizens. The Praetores Peregrini were the individuals who had jurisdiction over cases involving citizens and foreigners. Ius naturale ("natural law") was the concept that all persons had a kind of common sense, which the jurists developed to explain why all people seemed to obey some laws.

Ius scriptum ("written law") was the body of statute laws made by the legislature, known as leges (lit. 'laws') and plebiscita (lit. 'plebiscites', originating in the Plebeian Council). Roman lawyers would also include in the ius scriptum the edicts of magistrates (magistratuum edicta), the advice of the Senate (Senatus consulta), the responses and thoughts of jurists (responsa prudentium), and the proclamations and beliefs of the emperor (principum placita). Ius non scriptum ("unwritten law") was the body of common laws that arose from customary practice and had become binding over time.

Ius singulare ("singular law") was the special law for certain groups of people, things, or legal relations, as exceptional from the general rules of the legal system. For example, the ius singulare about wills written by people in the military during a campaign exempted them from the solemnities generally required for citizens when writing wills in normal circumstances. Ius commune ("common law") was the general, ordinary, law, as distinct from ius singulare.

Ius publicum ("public law") was the law that protected the interests of the Roman state. Roman criminal law was mostly private, with only the most severe crimes prosecuted by the state. Ius publicum was also used to describe obligatory legal regulations (today called ius cogens). Ius privatum ("private law") was the law that protected individuals, which included personal, property, civil and criminal law as well as the procedural law of judicial proceedings (iudicium privatum).

=== Public law ===
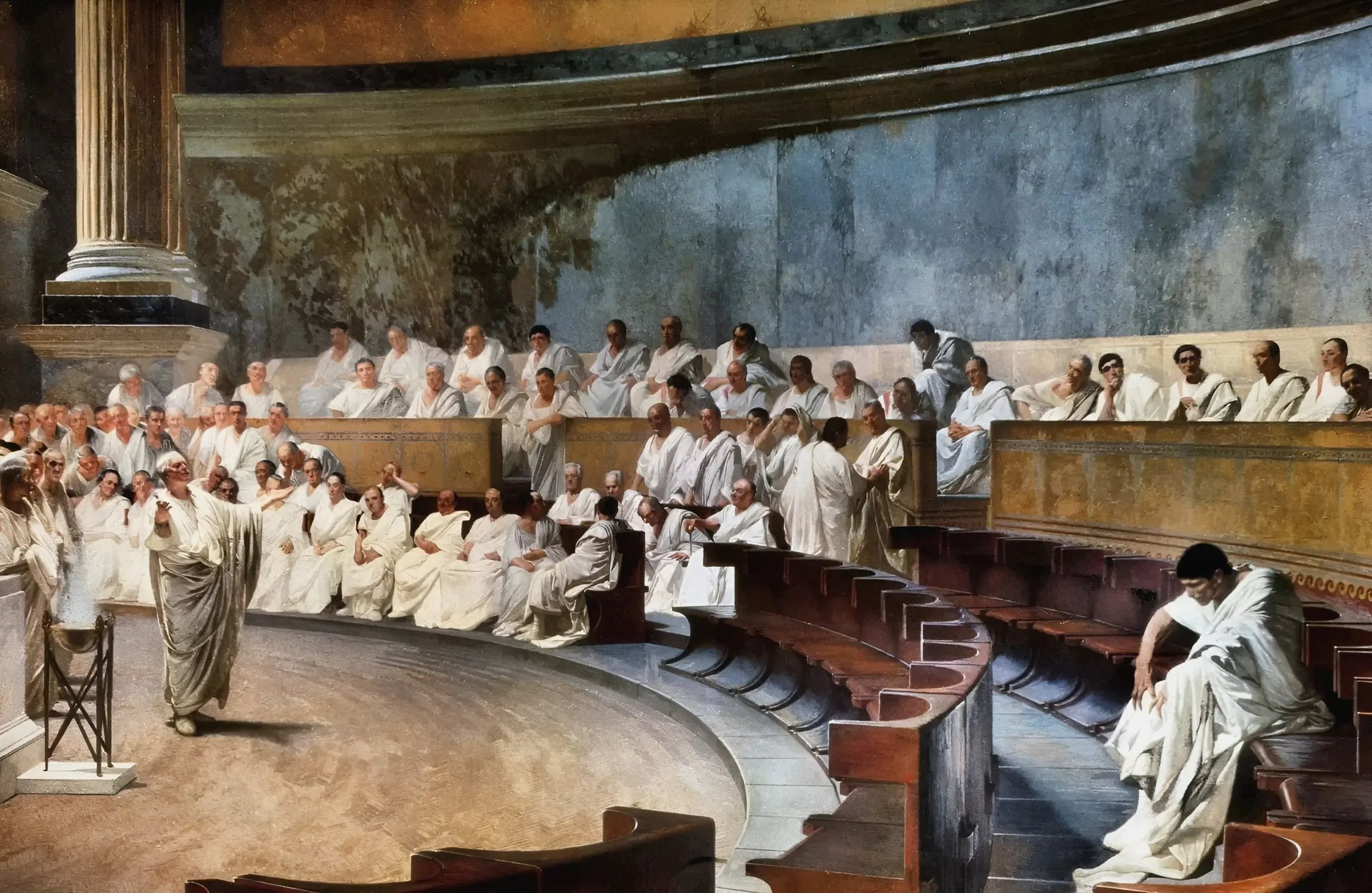
Cicero, author of the classic book The Laws, attacks Catiline for attempting a coup in the Roman Senate.

The Roman Republic's constitution or mos maiorum ("custom of the ancestors") was an unwritten, informal, and unofficial set of guidelines and principles passed down mainly through precedent, constantly evolving throughout the life of the Republic.

Throughout the 1st century BC, the power and legitimacy of the Roman constitution progressively eroded. Even Roman constitutionalists, such as the senator Cicero, lost a willingness to remain faithful to it towards the end of the Republic. When the Roman Republic ultimately fell in the years following the Battle of Actium and Mark Antony's suicide, what was left of the Roman constitution died along with the Republic. The first Roman emperor, Augustus, attempted to manufacture the appearance of a constitution that still governed the Empire, by utilising that constitution's institutions to lend legitimacy to the Principate, e.g., reusing prior grants of greater imperium to substantiate Augustus' greater imperium over the imperial provinces and the prorogation of different magistracies to justify Augustus' receipt of tribunician power. The belief in a surviving constitution lasted well into the life of the Roman Empire.

Concepts that originated in the Roman constitution live on in constitutions to this day. Examples include checks and balances, the separation of powers, vetoes, filibusters, quorum requirements, term limits, impeachments, the powers of the purse, and regularly scheduled elections. Even some lesser used modern constitutional concepts, such as the block voting found in the electoral college of the United States, originate from ideas found in the Roman constitution.

=== Private law ===
Stipulatio was the basic form of contract in Roman law. It was made in the format of question and answer. The precise nature of the contract is disputed.

Rei vindicatio is a legal action by which the plaintiff demands that the defendant return a thing that belongs to the plaintiff. It was only used when the plaintiff owns the thing, and the defendant somehow impeded the plaintiff's possession of the thing. The plaintiff could also institute an actio furti, a personal action, to punish the defendant. If the thing could not be recovered, the plaintiff could also claim damages from the defendant with the aid of the condictio furtiva, another personal action. With the aid of the actio legis Aquiliae, another personal action, the plaintiff could claim damages from the defendant. Rei vindicatio was derived from the ius civile, and was only available to Roman citizens.

=== Status ===
A person's abilities and duties within the Roman legal system depended on their legal status. The individual could have been a Roman citizen (status civitatis), unlike a foreigner; been free (status libertatis), unlike slaves; or had a certain position in a Roman family (status familiae) either as the head of the family (pater familias) or some lower member (alieni iuris "one who lives under someone else's law").

=== Litigation ===
The history of Roman Law can be divided into three systems of procedure: legis actiones, the formulary system, and cognitio extra ordinem. The periods in which these systems were in use overlapped and did not have definitive breaks. Roughly, legis actio system prevailed from the time of the Twelve Tables (c. 450 BC) until about the end of the 2nd century BC; the formulary procedure was primarily used from the last century of the Republic until the end of the classical period (c. AD 200); and cognitio extra ordinem was used in post-classical times.

During the republic and until the bureaucratization of Roman judicial procedure, the judge was usually a private person (iudex privatus). He had to be a Roman male citizen. The parties could agree on a judge, or they could appoint one from a list of judges known as the album iudicum. They went down the list until they found a judge agreeable to both parties, or if none could be found they had to take the last one on the list.

No one had a legal obligation to judge a case. Judges had great latitude in the way they conducted litigation. He considered all the evidence and ruled in the way that seemed just. Because the judge was not a jurist or a legal technician, he often consulted a jurist about the technical aspects of the case, but he was not bound by the jurist's reply. At the end of the litigation, if things were not clear to him, he could refuse to give a judgment, by swearing that it wasn't clear. Also, there was a maximum time to issue a judgment, which depended on some technical issues of law.

Later on, with the bureaucratization, this procedure disappeared, and was substituted by the so-called extra ordinem procedure, also known as the cognitory system. The whole case was reviewed before a magistrate in a single phase. The magistrate had obligation to judge and to issue a decision, and the decision could be appealed to a higher magistrate.

== Legacy ==
German legal theorist Rudolf von Jhering famously remarked that ancient Rome had conquered the world three times: the first through its armies, the second through its religion, the third through its laws. He might have added: each time more thoroughly.

— David Graeber, Debt: The First 5,000 Years

=== In the West ===
In the west, Justinian's political authority never went any farther than certain portions of the Italian and Iberian peninsulas. In law codes issued by the Germanic kings, however, the influence of early Eastern Roman codes on some of these is discernible. In many early Germanic states, Roman citizens continued to be governed by Roman laws for quite some time, even while members of the various Germanic tribes were governed by their own respective codes.

The Codex Justinianus, Institutes of Justinian, and the earlier code of Theodosius II were well known in Western Europe and served as models for a few of the Germanic law codes. However, the Digest portion was largely ignored for several centuries until around 1070, when a manuscript of the Digest was rediscovered in Italy. This was done mainly through the works of glossators who wrote their comments between lines (glossa interlinearis), or in the form of marginal notes (glossa marginalis). From that time, scholars began to study the ancient Roman legal texts, and to teach others what they learned from their studies. The center of these studies was Bologna. The law school there gradually developed into Europe's first university.

There are several reasons that Roman law was favored in the Middle Ages. Roman law regulated the legal protection of property and the equality of legal subjects and their wills, and it prescribed the possibility that the legal subjects could dispose of their property through testament. The students who were taught Roman law in Bologna (and later in many other places) found that many rules of Roman law were better suited to regulate complex economic transactions than the customary rules applicable throughout Europe. For this reason, Roman law, or at least some provisions borrowed from it, began to be re-introduced into legal practice, centuries after the end of the Roman empire. This process was actively supported by many kings and princes who employed university-trained jurists as counselors and court officials and sought to benefit from rules like princeps legibus solutus est ("The sovereign is not bound by the laws", a phrase initially coined by Ulpian, a Roman jurist).

By the middle of the 16th century, the rediscovered Roman law dominated the legal practice of many European countries. A legal system, in which Roman law was mixed with elements of canon law and of Germanic custom, especially feudal law, had emerged. This legal system, which was common to all of continental Europe (and Scotland), was known as ius commune. This ius commune and the legal systems based on it are usually referred to as civil law in English-speaking countries.

Only England and the Nordic countries did not take part in the wholesale reception of Roman law. One reason for this is that the English legal system was more developed than its continental counterparts by the time Roman law was rediscovered. Therefore, the practical advantages of Roman law were less obvious to English practitioners than to continental lawyers. As a result, the English system of common law developed in parallel to Roman-based civil law, with its practitioners being trained at the Inns of Court in London rather than receiving degrees in canon or civil law at the Universities of Oxford or Cambridge. Elements of Romano-canon law were present in England in the ecclesiastical courts and, less directly, through the development of the equity system. In addition, some concepts from Roman law made their way into the common law. Especially in the early 19th century, English lawyers and judges were willing to borrow rules and ideas from continental jurists and directly from Roman law.

The practical application of Roman law, and the era of the European ius commune, came to an end when national codifications were made. In 1804, the French civil code came into force. In the course of the 19th century, many European states either adopted the French model or drafted their own codes. In Germany, the political situation made the creation of a national code of laws impossible. From the 17th century, Roman law in Germany had been heavily influenced by domestic (customary) law, and it was called usus modernus Pandectarum. In some parts of Germany, Roman law continued to be applied until the German civil code (bürgerliches Gesetzbuch, BGB) went into effect in 1900.

Colonial expansion spread the civil law system.

=== Today ===
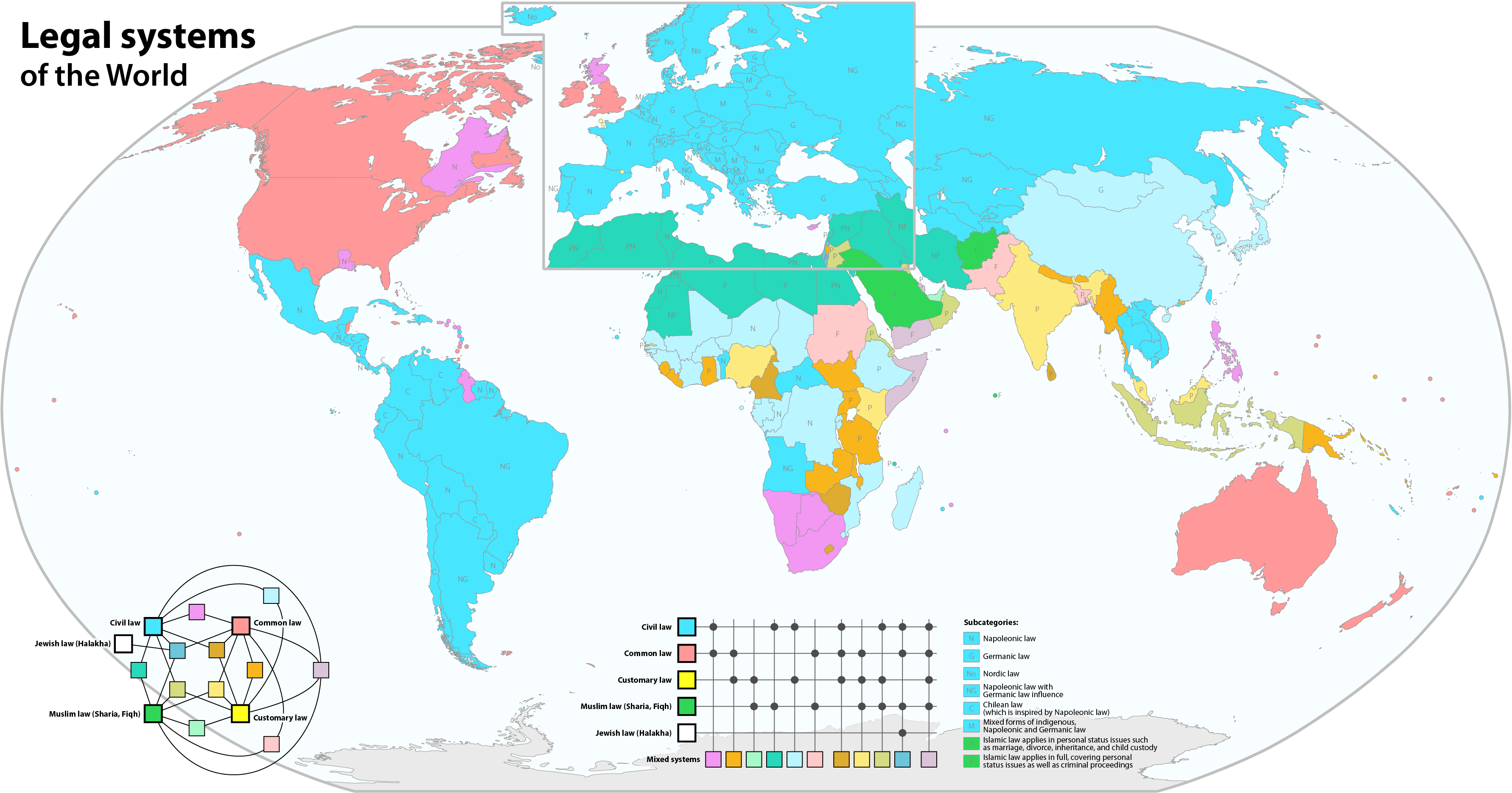
Legal systems of the world. Blue is based on Roman law.

Today, Roman law is no longer applied in legal practice, even though the legal systems of some countries like South Africa and San Marino are still based on the old ius commune. However, even where the legal practice is based on a code, many rules deriving from Roman law apply: no code completely broke with the Roman tradition. Rather, the provisions of the Roman law were fitted into a more coherent system and expressed in the national language. For this reason, knowledge of the Roman law is indispensable to understand the legal systems of today. Thus, Roman law is often still a mandatory subject for law students in civil law jurisdictions. In this context, the annual International Roman Law Moot Court was developed in order to better educate the students and to network with one another internationally.

As steps towards a unification of the private law in the member states of the European Union are being taken, the old jus commune, which was the common basis of legal practice everywhere in Europe, but allowed for many local variants, is seen by many as a model.

== See also ==
- Abalienatio (legal transfer of property)
- Auctoritas (power of the sovereign)
- Capitis deminutio
- Cessio bonorum (surrender of goods to a creditor)
- Compascuus (common pasture)
- Constitution (Roman law)
- Homo sacer
- Inheritance law in ancient Rome
- Justitium (akin to modern state of exception)
- List of Roman laws
- Res extra commercium
- Ancient Greek law
- Roman-Dutch law

== Sources ==
- Berger, Adolf, "Encyclopedic Dictionary of Roman Law", Transactions of the American Philosophical Society, Vol. 43, Part 2., pp. 476. Philadelphia : American Philosophical Society, 1953. (reprinted 1980, 1991, 2002). ISBN 1-58477-142-9
