= Gasser v MISAT =

- European Court of Justice

Decided 9 December 2003
- Full case name: Erich Gasser GmbH v MISAT Srl.
- Case: C-116/02
- CelexID: 62002CJ0116
- ECLI: ECLI:EU:C:2003:657
- Case type: Reference for a preliminary ruling
- Chamber: Full court
- Language of proceedings: German
- Nationality of parties: Austrian and Italian
- Procedural history: Court first seized : Tribunale civile e penale di Roma (IT); Court Second seized Landesgericht Feldkirch (AT); Appeal stay AT: Oberlandesgericht Innsbruck (AT)

Ruling
- Article 21 of the Brussels Convention must be interpreted as meaning that a court second seised whose jurisdiction has been claimed under an agreement conferring jurisdiction must nevertheless stay proceedings until the court first seised has declared that it has no jurisdiction. It cannot be derogated from where, in general, the duration of proceedings before the courts of the Contracting State in which the court first seised is established is excessively long.

Court composition
- Judge Rapporteur; Romain Schintgen
- Advocate General; Philippe Léger

Instruments cited
- Brussels convention (1968)

Legislation affecting
- Brussels I Regulation, Lugano conventions

Gasser v MISAT (C–116/02) was a decision of the European Court of Justice regarding the interpretation of the Brussels convention of 1968 ruling that a court chosen in a choice of court agreement should stay its proceedings - as any other court chosen second within the Brussels regime - until the court first seized had declared it did not have jurisdiction. The court's decision was considered problematic as it favoured the uniformity of application of the Brussels regime jurisdictional rules temporarily over party autonomy. Due to similar provisions in the 2001 Brussels Regulation and Lugano Conventions, the interpretation also affects choice of court agreements under those later instruments. However, in the 2012 Recast version of the Brussels I Regulation chosen courts can take jurisdiction, even if a court not chosen has been addressed first.

== Facts ==
Austrian supplier Gasser and Italian distributor MISAT entered into a contract together for the supply of children's clothes. In the contract, they included a choice-of-court agreement, stipulating that an Austrian court have jurisdiction in case of conflict. However, when a dispute arose between the two parties, MISAT seised an Italian court to declare that the contract had been terminated, contrary to the choice-of-court clause they agreed on.

MISAT relied on Article 21 of the Brussels Convention, a convention to which all members of the European Community were party, and which regulates which court within those states has jurisdiction. The convention contains a lis alibi pendens-rule: where proceedings involving the same issue and between the same parties are brought before the courts of different Member States, the court seised second must stay proceedings up until the jurisdiction of the court first seised has been established – after which the court second seised must decline jurisdiction if the court first seised is indeed found to have jurisdiction. Consequently, Article 21 of the Convention establishes a type of "first come, first served"-rule: when there is a triple identity in parties, object, as well as cause of action, the court that has been seised second will only be able to decide in the case when it has been decided in the first court that the latter has no jurisdiction. The Report Jenard cites the need to "facilitate the proper administration of justice within the Community" as the underlying idea behind this lis alibi pendens rule, as irreconcilable judgments would obstruct such proper administration and ultimately be detrimental to the "mutual trust in the administration of justice in the Community". Consequently, the lis pendens-rule can be considered as an expression of the Regulation's search for both certainty and the preservation of mutual trust amongst Member States.

The problem however in the case at hand was that the parties had first made an agreement as to which court would have jurisdiction in case of conflict- namely an Austrian court. Consequently, Gasser brought the same case before the Oberlandesgericht (Higher Regional Court) Innsbruck in Austria, where the question was eventually passed on to the European Court of Justice of whether or not the lis pendens-rule could override the parties' autonomous decision contained in their choice-of-court agreement and thus, if the abovementioned rule contained in Article 21 of the convention was applicable or not.

== CJEU procedure ==
The reference for a preliminary ruling were made on 25 March 2002, and observations were made -in addition to the parties in the dispute- by Italy, the United Kingdom and the European Commission. While Italy, the Commission and Misat contended that the lis pendens doctrine needed to take precedence, and that thus the court second seized should stay its proceedings until the first court had decided on its position, the UK and Gasser argued that the choice of the parties should take immediate precedence over the lis pendens rule.

=== Advocate-General ===
The (advisory) opinion of Advocate-General was delivered on 9 September 2003. The Advocate-general held that the European Court of Justice had the possibility to rule that a valid choice of court clause amounted exclusive jurisdiction to a (group of) courts, and that thus it was possible to derogate from using the lis pendens doctrine and give such a court immediate jurisdiction. The court had made a similar exception before in Overseas Union Insurance Ltd and Deutsche Ruck Uk Reinsurance Ltd and Pine Top Insurance Company Ltd v New Hampshire Insurance Company where it ruled that if one of the "exclusive jurisdiction" grounds of Article 16 applied, the court that had exclusive jurisdiction did not have to stay proceedings, even if it was seized second. The exclusive jurisdiction of choice of court agreements/clauses is however placed in Article 15, and thus is not automatically covered by the judgments. The Advocate general suggested to only allow a court seized second (and which was chosen in a choice of court clause/agreement) "where there is no room for any doubt as to the jurisdiction of the court second seised"; to avoid the situations where both courts would assume jurisdiction.

=== Decision ===
The Court resolutely rejected the possibility that the party autonomy could take precedence over the abovementioned goals of certainty and mutual trust, stating that "the court second seised is never in a better position than the court first seised to determine whether the latter has jurisdiction". Even though the Austrian court was consistent with the parties choice-of-court agreement, it was for the court first seized to decide it had not jurisdiction and the presence of such a clause is "not such as to call in question the application of the procedural rule contained in Article 21 of the Convention [now Article 27], which is based clearly and solely on the chronological order in which the courts involved are seised".

== Relevance ==
The ruling by the Court has implications not only for the application of the Brussels Convention, but also by the Brussels I Regulation (44/2001) that mostly replaced it, and for the interpretation by EU states of the Lugano Conventions of 1998 and 2007 that contain similar provisions.

First, there is the (unlikely) risk that the court first seised finds the jurisdiction clause invalid, which consequently takes away the possibility for the designated court to decide the case, even if the latter would have declared the clause valid. Although the Court in Gasser first seems to minimise the likelihood of this hypothesis by stating that a jurisdiction clause "must be regarded as an independent concept", it nonetheless points out that verifying the existence of jurisdiction clauses "may necessitate delicate and costly investigations". As a result, although unlikely, there is still a risk that two courts from different Member States will decide upon the validity of a jurisdiction clause differently.

Second, the Court's ruling, which imposes a sort of absolute first-come, first-served principle, promotes the use of tactical litigation and "torpedo claims". The reason why can be described as the difference between theory and reality. In theory, the fact that a party would have to turn to a different Member State for a ruling in his case is irrelevant or even meaningless, as the Brussels I Regulation rests upon the axiomatic assumption that procedural justice is served wherever in the community proceedings are heard. In reality however, this fact is of great tactical significance to the recalcitrant party, since -apart from the aforementioned fact that the first court seised may determine the effect of Article 23 differently- some Member States have a system of much slower-moving judiciary, which makes the realisation of procedural justice unlikely. Italy is a prime example thereof, with decisions on jurisdiction alone taking several months or even years; commencing proceedings in Italy is accordingly dubbed "firing the Italian torpedo". This torpedo may well sink a jurisdiction agreement, as the crude confrontation with increased delay and expense for the other party makes it not only unlikely for him to recommence proceedings in the agreed court after jurisdiction has been settled, but can even deter him from litigating altogether at the sight of the location of the court first seised.

In conclusion, not only may the party defending the choice-of-court agreement experience substantive disadvantages in the other Member State, as the court situated there might declare the agreement invalid, the party may also be exposed to procedural disadvantages, caused by judicial system which is not chosen. This in turn can make the jurisdiction agreement ineffective altogether, going against the principle of party autonomy. Taking a formalistic and literal approach, the Court states that "the difficulties of the kind (...) stemming from delaying tactics by parties (...) are not such as to call in question the interpretation of the Brussels Convention, as deduced from its wordings and purpose", pointing out that the Regulation "is necessarily based on the trust which Contracting States accord to each other's legal systems and judicidial institutions".

== Effect on the Brussels Regulation ==
In the Recast of the Brussels I Regulation, the Commission addressed the problems created by the Gasser judgment. Dealing with the problematic tactical litigation spawning from the Gasser judgment, the Recast Regulation now contains a reversal of the priority rule, by giving the court chosen by the parties in the jurisdiction agreement precedence over all other courts, regardless of when proceedings were initiated. From a prima facie point of view, this certainly seems to deal the Gasser problem effectively, as a tactical race to the court is now without effect. However, some have raised the question to whether or not this will simply encourage the use of 'sham jurisdictional agreements', and if this indisputable preference for allegedly-chosen courts could not just lead to “improved” or “reverse” torpedo claims.
