= Patent law in the Netherlands =

Patent law in the Netherlands, or simply Dutch patent law, is mainly governed by the Kingdom Patents Act (Dutch: Rijksoctrooiwet) and the European Patent Convention. A patent covering the Netherlands can be obtained through three different routes: through the direct filing of a national patent application with the Netherlands Patent Office (Dutch: Octrooicentrum Nederland) (direct national route), through the filing of a European patent application (European route), or through the filing of an international application under the Patent Cooperation Treaty followed by the entry into European phase of said international application (Euro-PCT route). The Dutch patent has a term of 20 years and has effect in the (European and Caribbean) Netherlands, Curaçao and Sint Maarten. Aruba has its own patent system.

== Dutch patent ==
National patents applied for directly with Netherlands Patent Office are so-called ‘registration patents’ (Dutch: registratieoctrooien): no substantial examination takes place, and the patent is granted if certain formalities have been fulfilled. European patents designating the Netherlands have the same effect as direct national patents, provided that the patent description is translated in English (if not already in English) and the claims in Dutch (The Netherlands has ratified the London Agreement (2000)). Also unitary patents apply in the Netherlands after entry into force of the Unified Patent Court agreement in June 2023. The unitary effect (which formally only applies in the European part of the Netherlands), is automatically extended to Curacao, Sint Maarten and Bonaire, Sint Eustatius and Saba).

Inventions have to fulfill three requirements to be patentable: they have to be new, inventive and industrially applicable. Patents can be licensed and such license has effect against third parties only after registration with the Intellectual property office. The patents act provides for the grant of compulsory licenses in the public interest if the patent owner refuses to grant a license, and grant of compulsory licenses to the Kingdom in wartime.

== History ==
Although a patent system existed in the Netherlands as part of French law before, the January 1817 patents act was the first patent act approved in the United Kingdom of the Netherlands. The act was repealed in 1869. In 1910 the Patent Act came into effect, which after being renamed to Kingdom Patents Act in 1968 was revised substantially in 1979 to provide for the entry into force of the European Patent Convention. The success of the EPC led to a decline in national patents applied for directly at the Dutch Patent Office, which resulted in the conversion to a registration patent (Dutch: registratieoctrooien) in the Rijksoctrooiwet 1995, the 1995 version of the Kingdom Patents Act that was a recast of the Rijksoctrooiwet.

== Territorial scope ==
From the start, the 1910 Patents Act has been applicable for the whole Dutch Empire, although from 1956 until the 1960s changes were made to the act in order to reduce the backlog in patent applications and to apply the London act of the Paris Convention that initially did not apply to Suriname and the Netherlands Antilles, as this reduced the approval procedure.

From 1995, Aruba fell (mostly) out of scope of Dutch patent law with the introduction of the Aruban patent. The European Patent Convention only became applicable to the Netherlands Antilles in 2007, and thus provisions regarding European patents only apply there since then. The dissolution of the Netherlands Antilles in 2010 had no effect on the applicability of the patents law and remained applicable in the Caribbean Netherlands, Curaçao and Sint Maarten. Supplementary protection certificates are also regulated by the Rijksoctrooiwet, and do only apply to the European Netherlands.

== Litigation ==
The court of The Hague is exclusively competent to decide issues regarding patents in the Netherlands, including validity, infringement and ownership. Until around 2008, Dutch courts would render decisions regarding European patents that covered not only the Netherlands, but also other European Union member states, and other Lugano convention member states under the Spider in the web doctrine. If a defendant had his centre of activities in the Netherlands (the ‘spider’), then decisions governing a European patent were also applied to the same European patent in other states. This possibility was limited by European Court of Justice decision in Roche and others (C-539/03, ECLI:EU:C:2006:458).

From 1 June 2023, the Unified Patent Court will have jurisdiction regarding unitary patents and other European patents (unless they have been opted out). The court of The Hague will still be competent regarding Dutch patents which are not European patents and non-opted out European patents. Regarding other European patents both courts will have jurisdiction.
