= Lis alibi pendens =

Principle of jurisdiction

The principle of lis alibi pendens (Latin for 'dispute elsewhere pending') applies in municipal law, public international law, and private international law to address the problem of potentially contradictory judgments. If two courts were to hear the same dispute, it is possible they would reach inconsistent decisions. To avoid the problem, there are two rules.

Res judicata provides that once a case has been determined, it produces a judgment either inter partes or in rem depending on the subject matter of the dispute: although there can be an appeal on the merits, neither party can recommence proceedings on the same set of facts in another court. If that rule were not in place, litigation might never come to an end.

The second rule is that proceedings on the same facts cannot be commenced in a second court if the lis (action), is already pendens (pending), in another court. Lis alibi pendens arises from international comity and permits a court to refuse to exercise jurisdiction if there is parallel litigation pending in another jurisdiction. Shany (2003) considers the problem within the public international law field where, for example, the Southern Bluefin Tuna dispute could have been determined either by the International Court of Justice (ICJ), or by tribunals established under the United Nations Convention on the Law of the Sea (UNCLOS), and the Swordfish dispute, which was submitted simultaneously to both the International Tribunal for the Law of the Sea (ITLOS) and a dispute settlement panel of the World Trade Organization (WTO). Kwak and Marceau (2002) consider the jurisdiction between the dispute settlement mechanisms of regional trade agreements (RTAs) and that of the WTO.

== European rules ==
Articles 27–30 of the Convention on Jurisdiction and the Enforcement of Judgments in Civil and Commercial Matters as amended by the "Brussels Regulation" lay down a framework of regulation to avoid conflicting judgments (see Brussels Regime).

The European Court of Justice ruled in Overseas Union Insurance Ltd. v New Hampshire Insurance Co. (1991) that Article 27 applies to all proceedings commenced in the courts of the European Union regardless of the habitual residence or domicile of the parties. The Article provides for the court first seised to have priority in the same cause of action between the same parties without giving a second court the right to examine the first court's grounds for accepting jurisdiction with Article 27(2) imposing a mandatory duty on the second court to decline any jurisdiction unless the first court determines not to accept jurisdiction. This places a duty on the first court to make the decision expeditiously. In Turner v Grovit judgment on April 27, 2004, an English court, being the first court seised, issued an injunction to restrain one of the parties from pursuing the proceedings they had commenced in Spain. Even where the defendant is acting in bad faith with the intention of frustrating the existing proceedings, the issue of an injunction was inconsistent with the Convention. The English court should trust the Spanish court to apply Article 27(2) (Blanke: 2004).

The question is what constitutes the "same cause". In Gubisch Maschinenfabrik v Palumbo (1987) (Hartley: 1988) and The Tatry v The Maciej Rataj (1994), the test is whether the factual basis of the claim and the laws to be applied are the same with a view to obtaining the same basic outcome. The test cannot be formal. It must look to the substance of each claim so that technical or procedural differences cannot be used to justify invoking separate jurisdictions in different Member States. One difficulty has been in rem jurisdiction, e.g. as in shipping law, but the substance test looks behind the res and identifies who the parties are and identifies what their purpose or objects are in the litigation. The parties must also be the same although the roles may be reversed between plaintiff/claimant and defendant (Seatzu: 1999). However, in multi-party actions, the subsequent court is only obliged to decline jurisdiction between the same parties, i.e. new parties may intervene and be heard in subsequent proceedings. But the courts are careful to look at the substance of the relationship between each set of parties. Thus, because an insurer has the right to use subrogation, the insurer and the insured would be considered the same person since they are both interested in achieving the same outcome. Similarly, a wholly owned subsidiary company can be regarded as the same party as its parent.

Article 28 deals with cases that are related, i.e. actions which are so closely connected that it is expedient to hear and determine them together to avoid the risk of irreconcilable judgments resulting from separate proceedings. But Article 28(3) allows the second court a discretion to consider whether it should stay the second action. Article 29 provides for conflicts of exclusive jurisdiction, but its application is still uncertain. Under Article 16 some courts are granted exclusive jurisdiction over a cause, e.g. under Article 16(4) the courts of the place of registration of a patent have exclusive jurisdiction on issues of validity and infringement, but if a party has already commenced proceedings in another state, Article 27(2) obliges the second court to dismiss the second suit.

The new Article 30 seeks to introduce an autonomous interpretation of the concept of seisin. The original rule identified the time of commencement by reference to the local rules in each Member State. This could lead to difficulties when a second state had different rules as to when an action commenced because it might allow a second action to overtake the first on a technicality (e.g. in some states the rule was that an action had not commenced until it was served, whereas others held that an action commenced on the day the pleadings were lodged or registered in the court office. The new Article 30 now provides that an action commences when the plaintiff/claimant takes the necessary steps to continue the proceedings which will usually be service and the system will, for the most part, avoid unfairness.

=== "Italian Torpedo" proceedings ===
Arising out of comity which requires each Member State to respect the courts and judgments of other Members, the theory underpinning Article 27 is a blunt and inflexible instrument because its effect is to stimulate each party to initiate proceedings before the court most likely to produce a favourable outcome. Thus, instead of avoiding forum shopping, it actually turns it into a race (Hartley: 1988). Where one party in a legal relationship foresees that action may be brought against them, they can pre-empt this and bring their own action to the court of their choice. This will result in the delaying of proceedings while jurisdiction is established. It may also mean that the case is decided in the court they wish, if it is established that the court has jurisdiction. This strategy has become known as a "torpedo" proceeding. The abuse of Article 27 was first described by Franzosi (1997 and 2002) in intellectual property disputes where a party infringing a patent commenced proceedings for a declaration before a court with long delays because of the number of cases waiting to be heard. Thus, no other European court could accept jurisdiction in cases alleging infringement by the patent holder. One possible response to this abuse of process might arise from the relationship between exclusive jurisdiction granted under Article 16 and the Article 27(2) mandatory duty. Article 29 reserves the priority for the first court when both courts have exclusive jurisdiction under Article 16. But the ECJ has not ruled on the situation where only the second court has exclusive jurisdiction. Article 35 provides that a judgment that conflicts with the provisions on exclusive jurisdiction cannot be recognised and enforced. Since Article 16(4) allows exclusive jurisdiction to the forum in the place of registration, this might provide an arguable case that the second court could review the ground upon which the first court had accepted the action. A further interesting development lies in the application of Article 6 which provides for multi-party proceedings and allows a person domiciled in a Member State to be sued in the state of any one of the defendants so long as there is a real connection between the cause of action and that state. The justification of this provision is one of efficiency. If an action involving many defendants and states can be consolidated, a single judgment enforced in all the relevant states saves costs and time and some Member States are now issuing cross-border injunctions in intellectual property (IP) disputes (see Eisengraeber (2004) for a detailed evaluation of this option). A final option to consider is that the IP licensor should include exclusive jurisdiction clauses in the grant of all licences. Although such clauses almost certainly do not prevail over lis alibi pendens, some courts have been persuaded to prefer the parties' choice over torpedo actions. However, this approach will potentially create conflicting judgments and Article 35 will deny recognition to the subsequent forum's decisions. This situation may represent a breach of Article 6 European Convention for the Protection of Human Rights which stipulates that everyone is entitled to a fair and public hearing within a reasonable time. As it stands, one party's selection of a forum suffering from inordinate delays, effectively denies all the other parties a hearing. But it is uncertain whether the European Court of Human Rights would find this prejudice to be a breach of Article 6.

== United States ==
In the United States, Seguros Del Estado SA v. Scientific Games Inc., 262 F.3d 1164 (11th Cir. 2001) there was alleged parallel litigation in the U.S. state of Georgia and the country of Colombia. It was held that the threshold question was whether the two cases were genuinely parallel. Applying Finova Capital Corp. v. Ryan Helicopters U.S.A., Inc., 180 F.3d 896, 898 (7th Cir. 1999), the court concluded that the two cases were not parallel since they involved materially different issues, documents, and parties. Thus, lis alibi pendens did not apply to terminate the proceedings.

== See also ==
- Lis pendens
