= Netherlands Patent Office =

Coordinates: 52°2′25.3″N 4°20′13.42″E

The Netherlands Patent Office (Dutch: Octrooicentrum Nederland) is the patent office of the Netherlands. It is an agency of the Dutch Ministry of Economic Affairs and Climate Policy. The agency is located in the premises of the Netherlands Enterprise Agency in The Hague. The Netherlands Patent Office grants patents in the Netherlands and deals with European patents validated in the Netherlands. It assumes its functions from the Rijksoctrooiwet (Royal Patent Act).

Since the introduction of the Unitary Patent in 2023, a local division of the Unified Patent Court (UPC) is seated in The Hague. In 2024, all registry operations of the local UPC division in The Hague were transferred to the Netherlands Patent Office.

Before March 24, 2005, the Netherlands Patent Office was known as the Netherlands Industrial Property Office. Johannes Bob van Benthem served as Director from 1968 to 1977. As of August 1st, 2025, the Director is dr. Maja Schmitt.

== Regional offices in Curaçao and Sint Maarten ==
According to the Rijksoctrooiwet, both Curaçao and Sint Maarten may establish regional offices, that can receive applications for a Dutch patent. Further administrative actions are performed by the Netherlands Patent Office.

The Bureau for Intellectual Property of the Netherlands Antilles established its office in Curaçao. After the dissolution of the Netherlands Antilles on October 10th, 2010 Curaçao established their own regional office, which included the management of intellectual property registrations for Sint Maarten. On October 1st, 2015, Sint Maarten established the Bureau for Intellectual Property of Sint Maarten.

== Aruba ==
As Aruba does not take part in the Dutch patent system, it has its own patent and an autonomous patent office: the Bureau Intellectueel Eigendom (English: Bureau of Intellectual Property), based on the Octrooiverordening.
