= New Directions for Young Adults, Inc. v. Davis =

New Directions for Young Adults, Inc. v. Davis is a 2014 decision of a Florida state circuit court holding that using sock puppet accounts online is tortious interference with business relations, and awarding injunctive relief against it during the pendency of litigation.

== Background ==
New Directions for Young Adults, Inc. (NDYA) operates in Florida and California to provide psychotherapy, social skills training, vocational training, academic counseling, and training in financial management and life management skills for young adults with developmental or psychological disorders or disabilities, "who have failed to thrive.". Allegedly, Brian and Kathy Davis published derogatory statements on the Internet concerning NDYA's business and reputation, using various different false names. NDYA sued in Florida state court for defamation and tortious interference by creating a group of negative reviews of NDYA under several false identities. Kathy Davis had admitted in pretrial discovery that she used four separate names in her Internet posts—"Cheyanna, Kayla, Kathy D., and William P." One of her posts, written under the name Kathy D., said, "I agree totally with William P’s review" of NDYA.

== Circuit court ruling ==
The circuit court (trial court of general jurisdiction) found that the Davises "created a false impression of a group of negative reviewers about the Plaintiffs when in fact, there is no such group of negative reviewers: only the Defendants." Moreover, the court found that "the act of falsifying multiple identities" is conduct that should be enjoined. It explained that the conduct was wrongful "not because the statements are false or true, but because the conduct of making up names of person who do not exist to post fake comments by fake people to support Defendants' position tortiously interferes with Plaintiffs' business" and such "conduct is inherently unfair." The court therefore ordered the defendants to "remove or cause to be removed all postings creating the false impression that more [than one] person are commenting on the program than actually exist." The court also found, however, that "the comments of Kathy Davis or Brian Davis which do not create a false impression of fake patients or fake employees or fake persons connected to program (those posted under their respective names) are protected by the Constitution of the United States of America, First Amendment."

== Commentary ==
One commentator argued that the court was wrong to condemn sock puppetry, as such, by finding "that the act of falsifying multiple identities is the conduct to be enjoined". He insisted that the behavior properly to be proscribed is the tortious interference, not the means to the end. "In other words, the act of creating sock puppets in and of itself cannot be a tortious act and since it is not the tortious act the court can't proscribe it." The court misses the point; "it's not the account creation that caused the defamation, it is the use to which those accounts were put." Accordingly, "the court should not have enjoined the creation of false identities, it should have enjoined the use of those false identities to create a false impression" about NDYA.
