= Cross-border injunction =

Injunction with pan-EU effect

In European Union law, and especially in European intellectual property law, a cross-border injunction is an injunction by a court in one European country, such as for example a court in the Netherlands forbidding infringement in several other European countries.

== Background ==
The Brussels Regime instruments are a set of similar legal instruments, based on which jurisdiction (and recognition) is determined. The instruments are the Brussels I Regulations (44/2001 and 1215/2012), Lugano Conventions (1998, 2007) and the Brussels Convention (1968). The conventions together cover the European Union, Iceland, Norway, Switzerland, Aruba and all French territories.

A legal basis for cross-border injunctions may amongst others be found in Article 6(1) (most instruments) or Article 8(1) (EU regulation 1215/2012), providing that "a person domiciled in a Member State to also be sued

- where he is one of a number of defendants, in the courts for the place where any one of them is domiciled,
- provided the claims are so closely connected that it is expedient to hear and determine them together to avoid the risk of irreconcilable judgments resulting from separate proceedings".

== Case law ==
For a period in the late-1990s, national courts issued cross-border injunctions covering all Brussels regime jurisdictions, but this has been limited by the European Court of Justice (ECJ).

In two cases in July 2006, interpreting Articles 6(1) and 16(4) of the Brussels Convention, the ECJ held that European patents are national rights that must be enforced nationally, that it was "unavoidable" that infringements of the same European patent have to be litigated in each relevant national court, even if the lawsuit is against the same group of companies, and that cross-border injunctions are not available. In particular, the court set forth in grounds 41 of case C-539/03 that "Article 6(1) of the Brussels Convention ... does not apply in European patent infringement proceedings involving a number of companies established in various Contracting States in respect of acts committed in one or more of those States even where those companies, which belong to the same group, may have acted in an identical or similar manner in accordance with a common policy elaborated by one of them". In other words, there will be no close connection between claims as required by Article 6(1) if two closely connected companies domiciled in different Contracting States act (infringe) in the same manner.

Also in 2006, the ECJ decided on case C-04/03 (GAT/LUK). The court ruled that "Article 16(4) of the Convention … is to be interpreted as meaning that the rule of exclusive jurisdiction laid down therein concerns all proceedings relating to the registration or validity of a patent, irrespective of whether the issue is raised by way of an action or a plea in objection". As of 2015, Article 16(4) of the Convention corresponds to Article 24(4) of EU regulation 1215/2012. The ruling in case C-04/03 confirms that the courts of each Contracting State have exclusive jurisdiction on validity of patents registered for the territory of that State. Exclusive jurisdiction under Article 22(4) applies irrespective of whether a patent proprietor is sued for revocation or whether an alleged infringer asserts invalidity in inter partes proceedings.

In 2012, nearly six years after its rulings on cases C-04/03 and C-539/03, the ECJ decided on case C-616/10 (Solvay/Honeywell). The court held that "Article 22(4) of Regulation No 44/2001 must be interpreted as not precluding, in circumstances such as those at issue in the main proceedings, the application of Article 31 of that regulation". Since Article 31 is about provisional measures, a court may issue a cross-border injunction where an action aims for such measures. The ruling on case C-539/03 allows for a court to issue cross-border injunctions as provisional measures where companies domiciled in different Contracting States infringe in the same Contracting State.

== See also ==
- Enforcement of European patents
- Lis alibi pendens
- Spider in the web doctrine
