= Spider in the web doctrine =

Legal doctrine in Dutch patent law

The spider in the web doctrine is a legal doctrine in Dutch patent law governing cross-border injunctions in patent infringement cases. Under this doctrine, the Dutch courts would assume jurisdiction only in cases where the main defendant (the "spider") was located in the Netherlands and where the other defendants were part of a group of companies and acted based on a common business policy of this group (the "web"), regardless of the nation in which the disputed patent was issued.

Decisions by the European Court of Justice (ECJ) have cast some doubt on the continuing validity of this doctrine. This is due in part to the fact that the ECJ did not feel that Dutch courts were competent to make predictions or judgments about the validity of patents granted outside the Netherlands, preferring to grant jurisdiction to the countries in which the patent was granted.

== See also ==
- Brussels Regime
- Enforcement of European patents
- Unitary patent
