= Expungement in Texas =

Expungement in Texas is a legal process through which individuals seek erasure of an event from their criminal records.

== Background ==
Texas expungement law allows expungement (referred to as "expunction" Texas statutes) of criminal records which did not lead to a finding of guilt, certain class C misdemeanors when the defendant successfully completed deferred adjudication, successful completion of deferred prosecution agreements. If the defendant was found guilty, pleaded guilty, or pleaded no contest, they will not be eligible for expungement; however, it may be eligible for non-disclosure (more commonly referred to as record sealing) in the circumstances outlined below.

The Texas Young Lawyers Association and State Bar of Texas provide an informational packet about expungement as a service to the public.

== Juvenile offenses ==
Juvenile offenses potentially eligible for expungement include "misdemeanor[s] punishable by fine committed prior to the age of 17, [offenses] committed by [minors] under the Alcoholic Beverage Code and [convictions] for Failure to Attend School" under the Education Code. Disqualifying factors can include multiple convictions and insufficient age.

== Release, dissemination, and admissibility ==
The release, dissemination or use of expunged records by any agency is prohibited. Unless being questioned under oath, the defendant may deny the occurrence of the arrest and expungement order. If questioned under oath, the witness may only respond the matter was expunged.

== Legislation ==
The 76th Texas Legislature rejected a bill that would have expanded access to expungement. The 78th Texas Legislature failed to gain consensus for HB-384, which would have granted automatic expungement in the cases of acquittal, pardoning, or upon dropping of charges. The 82nd Texas Legislature's passing of HB-351 and SB-462 reformed the expungement code to include relief for those convicted but later determined to be innocent.

== Alternative remedies ==
Those ineligible for expungement may still seek an Order of Nondisclosure under some circumstances.

== Texas Record Sealing (also known as Orders of Nondisclosure) ==
Petitioning the court for an Order of NonDisclosure is often the best option for those that are not eligible for an expungement/expunction in Texas, and typically used in situations where a sentence of deferred adjudication was imposed by the court. With some exception, expungements are typically intended for situations where there was no finding of guilt. In other words, expungements are for when you've been found not guilty, your charges have been dismissed, your conviction was overturned on appeal, or you were arrested but never charged. The exceptions to this general rule are for when you've successfully completed deferred prosecution, or when you've successfully completed deferred adjudication for a Class C Misdemeanor.

An Order of Non-Disclosure does not completely eradicate your record like an Order for Expunction, but seals and generally removes it from the public domain. Your record may be visible to certain government agencies listed below, but it will be removed from the public domain and not appear in most background checks. After Tex. Gov't Code Section 411.0765 was amended in 2017, Texas law specifically allows for the disclosure of sealed records to most criminal justice agencies and these noncriminal justices agencies:

- The State Board for Educator Certification;
- School districts, charter school, private school, regional education service center, commercial transportation company, or education shared service arrangement;
- The Texas Medical Board;
- The Texas School for the Blind and Visually Impaired;
- The Board of Law Examiners;
- The State Bar of Texas;
- A district court regarding a petition for name change under Subchapter B, Chapter 45, Family Code;
- The Texas School for the Deaf;
- The Department of Family and Protective Services;
- The Texas Juvenile Justice Department;
- The Department of Assistive and Rehabilitative Services;
- The Department of State Health Services, a local mental health service, a local intellectual and developmental disability authority, or a community center providing services to persons with mental illness or intellectual or developmental disabilities;
- The Texas Private Security Board;
- Municipal or volunteer fire departments;
- The Texas Board of Nursing;
- Safe houses providing shelter to children in harmful situations;
- Public or nonprofit hospital or hospital district, or a facility as defined by Section 250.001, Health and Safety Code;
- The securities commissioner, the banking commissioner, the savings and mortgage lending commissioner, the consumer credit commissioner, or the credit union commissioner;
- The Texas State Board of Public Accountancy;
- The Texas Department of Licensing and Regulation;
- The Health and Human Services Commission;
- The Department of Aging and Disability Services;
- The Texas Education Agency;
- The Judicial Branch Certification Commission;
- A county clerk's office in relation to a proceeding for the appointment of a guardian under Title 3, Estates Code;
- The Department of Information Resources but only regarding an employee, an applicant for employment, contractor, subcontractor, intern, or volunteer who provides network security services under Chapter 2059 to:(A) * The Department of Information Resources; or(B) a contractor or subcontractor of the Department of Information Resources;
- The Texas Department of Insurance;
- The Teacher Retirement System of Texas;
- The Texas State Board of Pharmacy;
- The Texas Civil Commitment Office;
- A bank, savings bank, savings and loan association, credit union, or mortgage banker, a subsidiary or affiliate of those entities, or another financial institution regulated by a state regulatory entity listed in Subdivision (18) or by a corresponding federal regulatory entity, but only regarding an employee, contractor, subcontractor, intern, or volunteer of or an applicant for employment by that bank, savings bank, savings and loan association, credit union, mortgage banker, subsidiary or affiliate, or financial institution; and
- An employer that has a facility that handles or has the capability of handling, transporting, storing, processing, manufacturing, or controlling hazardous, explosive, combustible, or flammable materials, if:(A) the facility is critical infrastructure, as defined by 42 U.S.C. Section 5195c(e), or the employer is required to submit to a risk management plan under Section 112(r) of the federal Clean Air Act (42 U.S.C. Section 7412) for the facility; and(B) the information concerns an employee, applicant for employment, contractor, or subcontractor whose duties involve or will involve the handling, transporting, storing, processing, manufacturing, or controlling hazardous, explosive, combustible, or flammable materials and whose background is required to be screened under a federal provision described by Paragraph (A).

Record Sealing is often available in the following circumstances, upon meeting specific requirements:

- Successful completion of deferred adjudication
- Non-violent misdemeanors
- Certain DWI convictions
- Completion of Veterans Court
- Victims of human trafficking or compelled prostitution

The most common situations for record sealing are for those sentenced to deferred adjudication for misdemeanors or felonies. Many misdemeanors can be sealed immediately, while others have a two-year waiting period. For felonies, there is a five-year waiting period after successful completion of the sentence, and you cannot be convicted of any new crimes during that period. In 2017, major changes were made to Texas law relating to deferred adjudication, permitting the sealing of certain first-time DWI convictions if specific requirements were satisfied. Previously, DWI convictions were prohibited by statute from being sealed.

The following charges are never eligible for a non-disclosure:

- Aggravated and Regular Sexual Assault
- Indecency with a Child
- Prohibited Sexual Conduct
- Aggravated Kidnapping
- Burglary of Habitation with intent to commit the above-listed offenses
- Compelling Prostitution
- Sexual Performance of a Child
- Child Pornography charges
- Unlawful Restraint, Kidnapping, or Aggravated Kidnapping of a person younger than 17 years old
- Attempt, conspiracy, or solicitation to commit any of the above-listed offenses
- Capital Murder or Murder
- Injury to a Child, Elderly or Disabled person
- Abandoning or Endangering a Child
- Violation of a Protective Order
- Stalking
- Family Violence

== See also ==
- Criminal records in the United States
- Expungement in the United States
- Law of Texas
