= Second Inter-American Specialized Conference on Private International Law =

- Date: April 23 – May 8, 1979
- Location: Montevideo, Uruguay
- Type: International conference
- Theme: Private International Law
- Organized by: Organization of American States
- Outcome: Developed 8 international treaties

The Second Inter-American Specialized Conference on Private International Law (abbreviated as CIDIP II) was an international conference on private international law held in Montevideo, Uruguay, from 23 April to 8 May 1979. Representatives from 20 member countries attended the conference, organized by the Organization of American States (OAS) with the goal of continuing the work done during the First Conference (CIDIP I). By the end of the meetings, seven conventions and an additional protocol on private international law were approved.

== Background and development ==
In the final ruling of the Conference in Panama (CIDIP I) it was recommended to convene a second specialized conference in order to continue the codification of private international law, and Uruguay was suggested to be the next venue. This proposal was raised to the OAS' General Assembly to allow the Permanent Council create an agenda and to demarcate the topics not covered during the CIDIP I, and also to review the proposals made by the Inter-American Bar Association. By General Assembly resolution AG/Res. V-0/75 the Second Specialized Conference to be hold in 1979 in Montevideo was announced.

In May 1978, the Permanent Council approved the project of internal regulations of the Second Conference and the Inter-American Juridical Committee worked in the conventions drafts about the topics included on the list. By 1979 there was already a final draft of the agenda, that intended to cover themes such as proof and information on foreign law, preventive measures, cheques, international business law, legal capacity, domicile, enforcement of foreign judgments, international sale of goods, international maritime transport and general rules of private international law.

The conference started on 23 April 1979 in Montevideo, and attended representatives from 20 countries of the Americas, some of them diplomats and the others jurists or legislators, in addition to the presence of observers from international organizations. The proposed agenda was approved leaving the international sale of goods aside, and after that two working groups were established: one on procedural law and the other on other subjects of private international law.

The outcome of the work done by these commissions were four prototypes of conventions, reviewed by the assembly in several meetings, that in the end led to the approval of eight international treaties approved by majority, in addition to several rulings that mentioned the need to call for a new specialized conference to continue the work on the uncovered topics.

== Treaties ==
The approved treaties were:

- Inter-American Convention on Conflicts of Laws concerning Checks (1979)
- Inter-American Convention on Conflicts of Laws concerning Commercial Companies
- Inter-American Convention on Domicile of Natural Persons in Private International Law
- Inter-American Convention on Execution of Preventive Measures
- Inter-American Convention on General Rules of Private International Law
- Inter-American Convention on Extraterritorial Validity of Foreign Judgments and Arbitral Awards
- Inter-American Convention on Proof of and Information on Foreign Law
- Additional Protocol to the Inter-American Convention on Letters Rogatory
