= Brussels I Regulation 2012 =

Jurisdictional regime for courts in the EU

States applying Brussels regime instruments Brussels regulation, EU-Denmark agreement, Lugano convention EU-Denmark agreement, Lugano convention Lugano convention

The Brussels I Regulation (EU) 1215/2012 contains a jurisdictional regime: the rules which courts of European Union Member States use to determine if they have jurisdiction in cases with links to more than one country in the European Union. The basic principle is that the court in the member state of the party that gets sued has jurisdiction, while other grounds exist, which are diverse in content and scope, and are often classified in descending order of exclusivity and specificity. The original Brussels Regulation (44/2001) is, with regard to jurisdiction rules, very similar to the 2007 Lugano Convention (which applies when the dispute has links to more than one party the convention), containing the same provisions with the same numbering. Numbering and certain substantial issues are different in the 2012 recast version of the Regulation, which has applied since 1 January 2015 (1215/2012).

== General jurisdiction ==
The general principle of the Regulation is that individuals should only be sued in their member state of domicile. Domicile under the Regulation is not equivalent to the common law doctrine of domicile, but rather refers to a person's habitual or ordinary residence.

The Regulation sets out a finite number of exceptions from this general principle. Most of these exceptions are optional and enable plaintiffs to sue in a place other than the defendant's jurisdiction without requiring them to. However others are exclusive and preclude plaintiffs from suing in a place other than that of the member state conferred with the jurisdiction.

The general principle reflects the maxim Actor sequitur forum rei, or, he who acts (the plaintiff) must follow the forum (or jurisdiction) of the thing involved (the subject of the lawsuit, meaning the defendant). This rule is presented in Article 2(1) (2012 recast: Article 4(1)) of the Regulation that ‘persons domiciled in a Member State shall, whatever their nationality, be sued in the courts of that Member State’. The law leans in favour of the defendant, since it is “more difficult, generally speaking, to defend oneself in the courts of a foreign country than in those of another town in the country where one is domiciled”. Furthermore, Article 2(2) of the Regulation embodies the "principle of equality of treatment" by stating that 'persons who are not nationals of the Member State in which they are domiciled shall be governed by the rules of jurisdiction applicable to nationals of that State'. Although this is the 'general' jurisdictional rule of the Regulation, it only comes after the other articles in hierarchy and allows for many exceptions, making its general character rather relative; however, the latter is still reflected throughout the Regulation in the way how all exceptions to this rule must be interpreted strictly.

== Exclusive jurisdiction ==
Article 22 of the Regulation (2012 recast: Article 24) enumerates five specific cases in which the courts of a member state have jurisdiction regardless of the domicile of the parties to the action: plaintiff or defendant. These are:

- In disputes concerning the ownership of and rights in land and tendencies in land, exclusive jurisdiction is held by courts where the land is situated.
- In disputes concerning the validity of the constitution, the nullity or the dissolution of legal persons or their decisions, exclusive jurisdiction is held by courts where the legal person has its seat as determined by the rules of private international law.
- In disputes concerning the validity of entries in public registers, exclusive jurisdiction is held by the courts of the member state in which the register is kept.
- In disputes concerning the registration or validity of patents, trade marks, designs, or other registrable rights, the courts of the member state in which the registration has been applied for or registered.
- In disputes concerning the enforcement of judgments, the courts of the member state in which the judgment has been or is to be enforced.

The term “regardless of domicile” implies on the one hand that only the subject-matter of the action is relevant for jurisdiction, but not to the residence of the defendant. More specifically, the principal subject-matter of the action must fall within the scope of Article 22. On the other hand, parties do not have the choice of forum in this situation, and consequently, when a national court is seised that does not fall under the exclusive jurisdiction, it must decline jurisdiction. This exceptional case of exclusivity is justified in various ways; ranging from the presence of special legislation which, due to its complexity, "should preferably be applied only by the courts of the country in which it is in force" to interests of "legal certainty", with the goal to "avoid conflicting judgments". Sometimes however it is plainly clear why exclusive jurisdiction is needed; take for example the validity of entries in public registers.

Because exclusivity is an exception in the Brussels regime, it must interpreted as being such: strictly. For example, an action with regards to the first exception of immovable property must strictly be based on a right in rem, which consequently means that a preventive action geared solely towards halting the nuisance coming from an immovable property does not fall under the provision's scope. And with regards to the second exception; e.g. only challenging the validity of a decision of an organ of a company under the company law applicable or under the provisions governing the functions of its organs, as laid down in its Articles of Association, can warrant exclusivity, and not for example, the manner in which power is exercised by an organ of the company. Or finally, take the final exception with regards to the enforcement of judgments; only judgments can fall under the scope of the provision, and not say, preparatory steps such as freezing injunctions.

== Jurisdiction by appearance ==
Article 24 of the Regulation (2012 recast: Article 26(1)) defines another ground for a national court to stay or decline proceedings by setting forth that a court of a Member State before which a defendant enters an appearance shall have jurisdiction. This deals with the hypothesis of a plaintiff suing the defendant in a Member State that initially does not have jurisdiction; if the defendant shows up and does not plead that the court has no jurisdiction, the court will have jurisdiction from then on. The main rationality behind this provision is legal certainty, for it acts as an implicit choice of forum clause: the plaintiff gives his consent to the choice of new forum by initiating the procedure, while the defendant consents by appearing and not pleading lack of jurisdiction. Apart from the situation in which the defendant explicitly contests jurisdiction, Article 24 furthermore states that the rule of jurisdiction by appearance is not applicable whenever the exclusivity of the above-mentioned Article 22 comes into picture.

== Insurance, consumer and employment contracts ==
The Regulation provides special rules for insurance, consumer and employment contracts which may permit the "weaker party" to these contracts – i.e. insurance policy holders, consumers and employees – to sue in their state of domicile. The Regulation also provides that where a defendant to such an action is domiciled outside of the EU but has a "branch, agency or other establishment" in the EU, it shall be deemed to be domiciled where the "branch, agency or other establishment" is located.

The underlying rationality for dealing with this matter under the Regulation is that failure to do so “might not only have caused recognition and enforcement to be refused in certain cases on grounds of public policy, (...) contrary to the principle of free movement, but also (...) a general re-examination of the jurisdiction of the court of the State of origin”. Consequently, article 35 of the Regulation defines that no judgment will be recognised contrary to these special rules for protection.

The special protection these articles provide has as a main effect the broadening of the domicile of the 'stronger' party, so that the 'weaker' party, be it the consumer, employer or insured individual, has an increased range of locations for suing the first, while at the same time not allowing this broadened sense of domicile the other way around. For example, Article 18 of the Regulation states that a consumer may bring proceedings against the other party in both the Member State in which that party is domiciled as the Member State in which the consumer is domiciled, while at the same time providing that proceedings against a consumer may only be brought in the courts in the Member State in which the consumer is domiciled. Furthermore, when a 'stronger' party has no domicile in any Member State, but merely a "branch, agency or other establishment" in one of the Member States, it will be "deemed to be domiciled in that Member State". Lastly, an additional safeguard is installed by providing further mandatory rules governing an agreement that would deviate from the previously mentioned rules.

To be regarded as consumer contracts, several requirements must be met. First, there has to be a contract between parties, implying that there are “reciprocal and interdependent obligations between the two parties”. Secondly, there has to be a consumer contract, referring to the conditions set forth in Article 15(1) of the Regulation (2012 recast: 17(1)). Third, the consumer contract must be concluded with a consumer, implying that the concerning party is a “private final consumer not engaged in trade or professional activities”. As this protection is an exception to the general rule, it is the person invoking the protection to prove that he is a consumer, and if there is business and personal use to his purchase, to prove that “the business use is only negligible”. The court must not only take into consideration the "content, nature and purpose" of the contract, but also the "objective circumstances in which it was concluded".

== Agreements on jurisdiction ('choice of court' or 'prorogation of jurisdiction') ==
The Article 23 of the Regulation (2012 recast: Article 25) regulates the right of parties to determine (within boundaries) the court which professional parties may choose (prorogation of jurisdiction or choice of forum). The article stipulates that unless the parties have agreed otherwise, this jurisdiction is exclusive; however, unlike the exclusivity under Article 22 of the Regulation (2012 recast: Article 24), a judgment denying a choice of court agreement or its conditions cannot be refused recognition.

This provision, of which the Jenard Report states that it is “unnecessary to stress the importance (...), especially in commercial relations”, tries to strike a balance between two interests. On the one hand, it tries to "cancel out the effects of clauses in contracts which might go unread", implying that there must be safeguards to ensure that a party actually consented to the choice of forum, and on the other hand, "excessive formality which is incompatible with commercial practice" should be avoided, stressing the importance of not sacrificing too much of the swiftness of commercial practice. Keeping this in mind, there must be a "true agreement" between the parties in every manner of drafting the choice of forum clause, while at the same time, the court cannot "necessarily deduce from a document in writing" that there was in fact an oral agreement. As stated in the Colzani case, "the validity of the clauses conferring jurisdiction must be strictly construed" to ensure that "the consensus between the parties is in fact established".

The article provides three different methods of reaching a choice of forum agreement, which can be both formal and less formal, consistent with commercial practice. The first route to reach a choice of forum agreement, is through ‘writing or evidenced in writing’; consistent with the above-mentioned purpose however, the mere fact that for instance a clause conferring jurisdiction is printed among the general conditions on the reverse of the contract, is not sufficient on its own, since “no guarantee is thereby given that the other party has really consented”. Second, one can reach a choice of forum agreement 'in a form which accords with practices which the parties have established between themselves'; in this situation, an oral agreement can for example be sufficient, if it "forms part of a continuing trading relationship" and that "the dealings taken as a whole are governed by the general conditions of the party giving the confirmation". Indeed, in that scenario, it would be "contrary to good faith" for the recipient of the confirmation to deny the existence of a jurisdiction conferred by consent, "even if he had given no acceptance in writing". The third way to prorogate jurisdiction is, in the hypothesis of international trade or commerce, through a 'form which accords with a usage of which parties are or ought to have been aware and which in such a trade or commerce is widely known'.

Establishing whether or not a 'true agreement' has been reached between parties remains a factual question which has to be decided by the national courts; consequently, it is up to the Member States to decide how to address the substantive validity of choice of forum agreements, making the same agreement possibly valid in one country and invalid in another.

Even when a clear choice of court agreement is in place (and thus only that court would have exclusive jurisdiction), that court must stay its proceedings if another court within the Brussels regime was seized earlier until that court has determined that it has no jurisdiction according to the lis pendens doctrine. The new Article 31(2) in the 2012 recast regulation allows courts to take jurisdiction in such cases even if it is not the court first seized. This clause is consistent with the 2005 Hague Choice of Court Agreements convention, which the Union has signed, and for which the approval regulation is currently evaluated by the European Parliament.

== Special jurisdiction ==
The Articles 5 to 7 of the Regulation (2012 recast: Articles 7–9) constitute a “supplement” to the general jurisdictional rule as laid down in Article 2 of the Regulation. They provide the plaintiff with an extra option to sue the defendant in another Member State than that of his domicile. The justification for this broadening of the general jurisdictional rule, and at the same time the necessary condition for it, is the existence of a "close connecting factor between the dispute and the court with jurisdiction to resolve it", or simply a "close link".

Article 5 (2012 recast: Article 7) of the Regulation deals with several categories of special jurisdiction, of which the most common are probably torts and contracts.

Article 5(1)a (2012 recast: Article 7(1)a) of the Regulation states that the plaintiff may sue the defendant, domiciled in another Member State, ‘in matters relating to a contract, in the courts for the place of performance of the obligation in question’. This provision is slightly problematic on a theoretical level in two ways. First, ‘matters relating to a contract‘ lacks, although the European Court of Justice (ECJ) considers it as an "independent" and thus 'European' concept, a clear or uniform definition. The only thing present are definitions given in ECJ case-law that are rather abstract, consequently leaving parties in unclear cases to wait until the ECJ decides the matter. Second, 'the place of performance' lacks an independent European concept as well. However, unlike 'matters relating to a contract', the Regulation does contain a harmonisation of 'the place of performance' for two categories of (common) contracts in Article 5(1)b of the Regulation: sale of goods and the provision of services. However, Article 5(1)c (2012 recast: Article 7(1)c) of the Regulation defines that if the conditions for Article 5(1)b (2012 recast: Article 7(1)b) are not fulfilled, the standard provision of Article 5(1)a is applicable again, making the national law for defining ‘the place for performance’, in the absence of a uniform concept, take over.

Article 5(3) of the Regulation (2012 recast: Article 7(2)) gives the plaintiff, in matters relating to tort, delict or quasi-delict, the option to sue the defendant in the courts for the place where the ‘harmful event occurred or may occur’, in other words, the forum delicti commissi. In the Bier or Mines de Potasse case, the ECJ specified that the expression ‘place where the harmful event occurred‘ can encompass both “the place where the damage occurred and the place of the event giving rise to it”. Although this specification can be very helpful to the case, its implications, such as the possibility of a multitude of fora, have led to a rather extensive case-law governing the subject, making this provision a complex matter.

Article 6 of the Regulation (2012 recast: Article 8) provides a legal basis for the plaintiff of a multipartite case or case with consolidated claims to sue defendants in another Member State than their domicile, for example where the original claim is pending in case of a counter-claim or in any Member State a group of defendants whose claims are closely connected. The rationality behind this is to “obviate the handing down in the Contracting States of judgments which are irreconcilable with one another”.

== Residual jurisdiction ==
Article 4 of the Regulation (2012 recast: Article 6) provides the rule of residual jurisdiction; it allows the plaintiff to sue the defendant, who is not domiciled in any Member State, under the national jurisdictional rules of the Member State in which the plaintiff himself is domiciled, without affecting the application of the Articles 22 and 23 of the Regulation (2012 recast: Articles 24 and 25). This residual jurisdictional rule is justified on two grounds; first, to “ensure the free movement of judgments”, and second, to “perform a function in the case of lis pendens” (infra).

== Lis pendens and related actions ==
Chapter II, Section 9 of the Regulation deals with the hypothesis of lis pendens and related actions. The common objective and background rationality of all these articles is to "avoid the risk of conflicting judgments and thus to facilitate the proper administration of justice in the Community" by preventing that the same or related actions be decided upon by courts in different Member States. For the purposes of the articles under this section, Article 30 (2012 recast: Article 32(1)) defines what it constitutes for a court to be ‘seised’.

First, Article 27 (2012 recast: Article 29) of the Regulation contains the lis alibi pendens rule: proceedings involving the same cause and between the same parties brought in the courts of different Member States must be stayed until the jurisdiction of the court first seised has been established, after which it must decline jurisdiction.

Second, Article 28 (2012 recast: Article 30) of the Regulation functions as a sort of ‘safety-net‘ for actions which do not meet the above-mentioned requirements, but where the actions are nonetheless ‘related’: “they are so closely connected that it is expedient to hear and determine them together to avoid the risk of irreconcilable judgments resulting from separate proceedings”. As a consequence, Article 28(2) of the Regulation defines that any court other than the court first seised may, on the application of one of the parties, decline jurisdiction in favour of the first court for actions pending at first instance. Fitting in the general objective of avoiding conflicting judgments and facilitating proper administration, ‘related actions‘ must be interpreted broadly; therefore, all cases that carry a risk of conflicting judgments, even if the judgments can be separately enforced and have no mutually exclusive legal consequences, can be considered related cases for the purposes of this article.

Finally, Article 29 (2012 recast: Article 31(1)) of the Regulation states that when actions fall within the exclusive jurisdiction of more than one court, any other court than the first seised must decline jurisdiction in favour of that court. This can for example happen under the ancillary rule regarding holiday housing in Article 22(1) of the Regulation (2012 recast: Article 24(1)) that gives both the Member State in which the holiday house is situated jurisdiction as the Member State in which the defendant is domiciled.

== Provisional, including protective, measures ==
Finally, Article 31 of the Regulation (2012 recast: Article 35) states that courts of one Member State may give provisional, including protective, measures although courts in another Member State have jurisdiction as to the substance of the matter. This is an expression of the fact that the jurisdictional rules of the Brussels I Regulation do not regulate provisional measures; consequently, the competent court of any Member State may give such measures “without regard to the rules of jurisdiction laid down in the Convention”. However, importantly, the measures given must be provisional only: they must be “intended to preserve a factual or legal situation so as to safeguard rights the recognition of which is sought elsewhere from the court having jurisdiction as to the substance of the matter”.
