= Expungement in the United States =

Expungement in the United States is a process which varies across jurisdictions. In general, expungement is a process through which all records of an arrest and of any subsequent court proceedings are removed from the public record, and the individual may legally deny or fail to acknowledge ever having been arrested for or charged with any crime which has been expunged.

Many states allow for state criminal records to be sealed or expunged, although laws vary by state. Some states do not permit expungement, or allow expungement under very limited circumstances. There is no standard or system for expungement of a federal criminal record.

== Federal ==
Federal offenses are difficult to obtain expungement and vary based upon the federal circuit. Unlike expungement for state offenses, there is no automated or standard system for federal expungement. Some federal circuits have upheld the inherent right of judges to order expungement while others have held the opposite. Most persons who have been convicted of federal offenses and who want relief from the consequences of the conviction are limited to seeking a pardon, but pardons are rarely granted.

=== Legislation ===
A number of bills have been introduced in Congress that would allow expungement of a federal criminal record, but none have become law.

==== Second Chance Act ====
U.S. Representative Charles B. Rangel proposed amendments to the Second Chance Act (2007) in 2009 and 2011, which were intended to "[amend] the federal criminal code to allow an individual to file a petition for expungement of a record of conviction for a nonviolent criminal offense." Representative Rangel was unsuccessful in this pursuit.

==== Fresh Start Act ====
U.S. Representative Steve Cohen introduced H.R. 2449 or The Fresh Start Act of 2011 during the 112th Congress, which would have allowed certain non-violent offenders to seek expungement of otherwise lifelong felonies. The bill was introduced but was not brought for a vote.

==== REDEEM Act ====
In July 2014, Senators Rand Paul and Cory Booker introduced the Record Expungement Designed to Enhance Employment (REDEEM) Act during the 115th Congress, a bipartisan bill in an effort to reform the criminal justice system which would, in part, allow for the expungement of Federal criminal records for one time, non-violent offenses. The bill was introduced but was not brought for a vote.

== State ==
Expungement laws are different for each state. States do not necessarily have to give full effect to orders of expungement or record sealing from other states, provided that they treat all persons equally when considering the effect of a person's criminal history.

=== Alabama ===
Alabama passed expungement legislation in 2014. The law allows for expungement for multiple situations, with applications fees, court fees, and lawyers fees to be paid by the applicant. However, convictions are not eligible for expungement.

=== Arizona ===
Arizona's expungement equivalent is "setting aside" a conviction. Arizona's setting aside statute allows a defendant to petition the court to have a conviction set aside after the terms of the sentence are met. If the court grants the petition, the defendant is "released from all penalties and disabilities resulting from the conviction other than those imposed by the Department of Transportation." The conviction can be used in any subsequent criminal prosecution.

=== California ===
California has several post-conviction remedies that are sometimes called expungement. For misdemeanor, and felony crimes (not involving a sentence in state prison), a petition for expungement is filed in the court of conviction, seeking to have the conviction dismissed pursuant to Penal Code section 1203.4. For crimes involving a prison sentence, a petition for a Certificate of Rehabilitation (CR) is issued by the courts and filed with the California Department of Corrections and Rehabilitation. Unlike an expungement, which is filed in the court of conviction, a petition for a Certificate of Rehabilitation is filed in the current county of residence. If the certificate of rehabilitation is granted, it automatically becomes an application for a pardon by the California Governor.

Further, Penal Code 851.8 provides that defendants whose cases have been dismissed or who were never charged after arrest may petition for a Declaration of Factual Innocence. If granted, all records of arrest and prosecution are to be sealed for three years, then permanently obliterated. Copies of this order are sent to both the CA Department of Justice and the FBI. Those granted this remedy may legally deny being arrested in all instances as the arrest is deemed "never to have occurred" in the first place.

=== Colorado ===
Colorado law has recently been changed via Colorado HB 11–1167, which allows drug conviction to be sealed. This requires strict conditions to be met concerning the original violation and the time and behavior since the conviction. This is part of a greater movement by the Colorado Criminal Justice Reform Coalition (ccjrc.org) to create a way for forgiveness and redemption for people who have been convicted based on past drug convictions.

=== Connecticut ===
In the State of Connecticut, individuals within a certain age group are defined as "Youthful Offenders" and the majority of those convicted within the defined age limitations may have their criminal record erased under Sec. 54-76o of CHAPTER 960a.

=== Delaware ===
In Delaware, Senate Bill 111 and Senate Bill 112 were passed and combined leading to the Clean Slate Law. The American Civil Liberties Union of Delaware assist in the expungement process.

=== Florida ===
Florida law allows for expungement of criminal records where the criminal case resulted in a dismissal by the court, a nolle prosequi (charges dropped) by the state attorney, or an acquittal by the judge or jury. Criminal records associated with cases receiving a final disposition of adjudication withheld are eligible for sealing in most but not all situations. To be eligible for sealing or expungement, the defendant must not have been adjudicated guilty of any criminal offense, must not have previously received an expungement or sealing, and must not be in the process of obtaining another sealing or expungement in another court.

==== Eligibility ====
A Certificate of Eligibility from the Florida Department of Law Enforcement is required prior to petitioning the court for an order to seal or expunge a record. An application to the FDLE must be completed and be accompanied with a certified disposition of the charge(s) seeking to be sealed or expunged. If an expungement is sought, the application to the FDLE must also be signed by the State Attorney attesting to the fact that the charges were dropped, dismissed, or that the person was found not guilty after trial.

There is a $75.00 charge for the Certificate of Eligibility. After obtaining the required certificate of eligibility, the person then must file a petition to seal or expunge and attach the FDLE certificate of eligibility, an affidavit indicating that they are eligible for sealing or expungement, and a proposed order for the judge to sign if the petition is granted.

==== Effect ====
The person who is the subject of a criminal history record that is expunged or sealed may lawfully deny or fail to acknowledge the arrests covered by the expunged record, except when the subject of the record:

1. Is a candidate for employment with a criminal justice agency;
2. Is a defendant in a criminal prosecution;
3. Concurrently or subsequently petitions for relief under the record sealing or expungement statutes;
4. Is a candidate for admission to The Florida Bar;
5. Is seeking to be employed or licensed by or to contract with the Department of Children and Families, the Division of Vocational Rehabilitation within the Department of Education, the Agency for Health Care Administration, the Agency for Persons with Disabilities, the Department of Health, the Department of Elderly Affairs, or the Department of Juvenile Justice or to be employed or used by such contractor or licensee in a sensitive position having direct contact with children, the disabled, or the elderly;
6. Is seeking to be employed or licensed by the Department of Education, any district school board, any university laboratory school, any charter school, any private or parochial school, or any local governmental entity that licenses child care facilities;
7. Is seeking to be licensed by the Division of Insurance Agent and Agency Services within the Department of Financial Services; or
8. Is seeking to be appointed as a guardian pursuant to Florida Statute Section 744.3125.

=== Georgia ===
Georgia law allows for "records restriction" which allows for the record of an incident to be restricted from the publicly available criminal records that the public are able to view. It does not allow for expungement in the traditional sense.

=== Illinois ===
Illinois law allows the sealing or expungement of parts of the records of a conviction. Sealing a conviction prevents the public, including employers, from gaining access to that record. To be eligible for sealing of a conviction record in Illinois one must have been sentenced to supervision. A waiting period of four years also is required, beginning at the time of discharge from supervision, where no convictions were entered. Some misdemeanors are ineligible for sealing. Effective January 1, 2014, many class 3 and 4 felonies are eligible for sealing.

=== Indiana ===
Indiana's Second Chance law, sponsored by Sen. Greg Taylor, D-Indianapolis, allows for the expungement of certain misdemeanor and felony offenses. Indiana Code 35-38-9-2 through 35-38-9-6 allows for the expungement of misdemeanors, and non-violent felonies. Most crimes of a sexual nature are excluded from the law but each section has other specific exclusions, and anyone determined to be a Sex or Violent offender (as defined by IC 11-8-8-5) is also ineligible.

A waiting period of 5 years is required for misdemeanors, as well as 8 years for a lesser felony. Ten years must have passed for more serious felonies. In addition to the waiting period, Section 2 ( Misdemeanors), Section 3 ( D Felonies and Level 6 Felonies), and Sections 4 and 5 (More serious Felonies) of the expungement statute also contain a lookback period equivalent to the waiting period. This means that in addition to the waiting period, the petitioner cannot have any other convictions anywhere in the U.S. in the previous 5, 8, or 10 years (depending on the type of conviction being expunged) from the date of filing the petition for expungement.

No charges must be pending against the individual and a fee must be paid to the clerk of the court. The individual's driver's license must not currently be suspended and they may not have a pending suspension. The person must have successfully completed their sentence, including any term of supervised release, and satisfied all other obligations placed on the person as part of the sentence. More serious felonies may require consent of the prosecutor.

=== Kentucky ===
Kentucky provides a process for expungement of most misdemeanor and felony charges. For cases that were dismissed or acquitted, an application for expungement can be made 60 days after the dismissal; for felony cases originally filed in District Court but which have not resulted in an indictment by the grand jury, an application for expungement can be made 6 months following the date of the District Court decision to hold the matter to the grand jury– KRS 431.076. The expungement of a conviction is permitted after five years after the completion of the sentence / probation if there have been no further convictions during that time period, and certain other conditions have been met – KRS 431.078.

Sex offenses, and crimes against children are not eligible for expungement. Kentucky requires that each person seeking an expungement after conviction obtain a certificate of eligibility through the Kentucky Court of Justice prior to petitioning for the expungement in the local court where the case was filed, which ensures that judges and prosecutors have accurate and current information regarding the status of petitioners. Starting July 15, 2020, all cases (except traffic cases) that are acquitted or dismissed with prejudice are automatically expunged within 30 days.

=== Michigan ===
Safe and Just Michigan is a non-profit that partners with other organizations to provide “expungement fairs” for Michiganders.

=== Missouri ===
Missouri has two forms of expungement, one generally applicable to criminal cases and a unique one for the crime of being a minor in possession of alcohol.

If certain requirements are met, Missouri law allows a person to have an arrest record expunged, which the law of Missouri defines as the process of legally destroying, obliterating or striking out records or information in files, computers and other depositories relating to criminal charges. Records expunged under this provision still may be opened to law enforcement if the person is charged with a subsequent offense or if any of the requirements of expungement no longer are met.

In 2005, the Missouri General Assembly enacted a special new section in the state's Liquor Control Law allowing for the complete and total expungement for the offense of being a minor in possession of alcohol. Unlike ordinary expungement, the MIP expungement exists with the explicit legislative mandate that the effect of an order of expungement under it "shall be to restore such person to the status occupied prior to such arrest, plea or conviction, as if such event had never happened."

Starting in 2018, Missouri will allow for the expungement of all non-Class A felonies and all misdemeanors, subject to exceptions for violent offenses, sex offenses, and other serious crimes, and for driving offenses involving liquor and commercial drivers licenses.

=== New Hampshire ===
New Hampshire statutes allow any person whose arrest has resulted in a finding of not guilty, or whose case was dismissed or not prosecuted, to petition for annulment of the arrest record at any time, free of charge.

Any person who has been convicted may petition for annulment after he/she has completed all requirements of their sentence, including probation, and paid a $100 fee to the department of corrections to cover the cost of an investigation into the criminal history of the petitioner:

- For a violation, one year, unless the underlying conviction was for an offense specified under habitual offender law.
- For a class A or B misdemeanor excluding sexual assault, 3 years.
- For a class B felony other than incest or endangering the welfare of a child by solicitation, 5 years.
- For a class A felony, 10 years.
- For sexual assault, 10 years.
- For felony indecent exposure or lewdness, 10 years.

The person whose record is annulled shall be treated in all respects as if he had never been arrested, convicted or sentenced, except that, upon conviction of any crime committed after the order of annulment has been entered, the prior conviction may be considered by the court in determining the sentence to be imposed, and may be counted toward habitual offender status.

In any application for employment, license or other civil right or privilege, or in any appearance as a witness in any proceeding or hearing, a person may be questioned about a previous criminal record only in terms such as "Have you ever been arrested for or convicted of a crime that has not been annulled by a court?"

=== New Jersey ===
New Jersey statutes allow expungement of conviction of many indictable offenses, disorderly persons offenses, municipal ordinances, and juvenile adjudications. With the exception of applicants who have graduated from a "special drug probation," the statutes disallow expungement for convictions if the applicant has been convicted of two or more indictable offenses, or four or more disorderly persons offenses.

Effective October 1, 2018, however, different crimes all reflected on a single judgment of conviction, or that occurred close in time and are related or interdependent can be grouped and counted as a single crime for expungement purposes. If the applicant has a combination of one criminal conviction and up to three disorderly persons convictions, both the criminal conviction and disorderly persons convictions can be expunged after the waiting period has been satisfied.

An unlimited number of disorderly persons convictions can be expunged provided that there are no criminal convictions, and the convictions for all of the disorderly persons offenses occurred on the same day. Until October 1, 2018, persons who had an indictable charge dismissed on account of a diversion could not thereafter have a criminal or disorderly persons conviction expunged.

Effective October 1, 2018, that bar vanished. No number-of-conviction limitations are imposed for persons who have satisfied drug court "special probation" provided that they have had no subsequent criminal, disorderly persons, or petty disorderly persons convictions. Those who enter a Pre-Trial Intervention (PTI) or Conditional Discharge are eligible to apply to have the indictment and program record expunged six months after completion of the program.

The ″normal″ waiting period before an indictable conviction can be expunged is six years, five years for disorderly offenses, and two years for municipal ordinances. In 2010, the waiting period on indictable convictions was lowered to five years. On April 18, 2016, the waiting period for disorderly persons offenses was lowered to three years. However, applicants who have not waited the full six years for indictable offenses, or the full five years for disorderly persons offenses, must satisfy the judge that granting the expungement is in the public interest. No such showing need be made once the full six (or five) years have elapsed.

N.J.S.A. 2C:52-7 states that under certain circumstances some individuals may qualify for an early pathway expungement. An early pathway expungement allows a person to isolate part or all of their record in less time: five years for a felony, three years for a disorderly person's offense. However, an early expungement has stricter criteria, not the least of which is that the defendant must prove that the early expungement is in the public interest.

Waiting periods begin to run on the date of sentencing, the date all fines are paid, or the completion date of probation or parole, whichever occurs last. Expungements can be granted when not all fines have been paid provided that the failure to pay was not willful. There is no waiting period for most dismissals and acquittals. However, if the dismissal arose on account of a diversion, there is a six-month waiting period. If the acquittal resulted from a finding of insanity or lack of mental capacity, records of the arrest cannot be expunged. Traffic offenses cannot be expunged. However, records of arrests and convictions for disorderly persons offenses that are defined in Title 39 (traffic statutes) can be expunged.

Expungements give the person the legal right to state, even under oath, that the event never occurred. Civil disabilities associated with the conviction are eliminated. However, expunged records must still be recited in certain situations. These situations include applications for employment with a law enforcement agency, applications for employment in the judicial system, applications for admission to the bar, and applications for a subsequent expungement.

Moreover, jurisdictions outside New Jersey are not required to recognize the relief granted by a New Jersey expungement. Records expunged after completion of "Special Probation" (see first paragraph, above) can be unexpunged if the person is thereafter convicted of another criminal, disorderly persons, or petty disorderly persons offense.

=== New York ===
New York Criminal Procedure Law 160.50 permits the "sealing" of cases where charges were dismissed, vacated, set-aside, not filed, or otherwise terminated. Otherwise, New York does not allow expungements, or "sealings," of cases where a conviction was entered, except for some older controlled substance, marijuana, and loitering offenses. Sealing a record under 160.50 will prevent the public from having access or seeing the records, including fingerprint cards, photographs, court entries, and other information related to the case. The record may still be made available to some entities, such as courts and law enforcement.

New York also permits the expungements of non-criminal dispositions (violations and traffic infractions, such as disorderly conduct) through New York Criminal Procedure Law 160.55. Misdemeanor and felony adjudications are not eligible.

Pursuant to New York Criminal Procedure § 160.58, a petitioner convicted of most felony drug, marijuana, or Willard non-drug eligible crimes may request to have their records for those crimes sealed if they successfully complete DIVERSION, DTAP, or a similar substance abuse treatment program recognized by the court. The sealing will also extend to up to three of the petitioners misdemeanor drug convictions.

Under New York Criminal Procedure § 160.59, subject to exceptions for sex offenses, Class A felonies and violent felonies, following a ten-year waiting period that begins on the later of a defendant's date of conviction or release from prison, courts have discretion to seal up to two convictions, only one of which may be a felony. Sealed records remain available to law enforcement and some licensing agencies are not available to the public. The law prohibits all employers and public licensing agencies from asking about convictions sealed under this law, or from taking adverse action based upon a sealed conviction.

The 2010 amendment to New York Criminal Procedure Law Article 440 creates a specific mechanism for survivors of trafficking to vacate prior prostitution convictions if the acts were committed as a result of having been trafficked. The law now provides, in relevant part, that a motion to vacate a judgment of conviction may be granted where: "...the arresting charge was under section 240.37 (loitering for the purpose of engaging in a prostitution offense, provided that the defendant was not alleged to be loitering for the purpose of patronizing a prostitute or promoting prostitution) or section 230.00 (prostitution) of the penal law, and the defendant’s participation in the offense was a result of having been a victim of sex trafficking under section § 230.34 of the New York Penal Law or trafficking in persons under the Trafficking Victims Protection Act." C.P.L. § 440.10(i) (2009) (effective Aug. 13, 2010).

The Clean Slate Act (CPL 160.57) of 2024 will automatically seal an individual’s New York State criminal records after 3 years for a misdemeanor and 8 years for a felony. The law does not apply to some offenses. The law is scheduled to take effect on November 16, 2024.

=== North Carolina ===
North Carolina's expungement statute, allows for one adult expungement per lifetime. Cases in which there was a dismissal of charges or a finding of not guilty can be expungement once the judgement is entered. Non-violent Class H and I felonies and non-violent misdemeanors can be expunged 15 years after completion of sentence. Exceptions are for drug related charges that involve methamphetamines or heroin, or possession with intent to sell and deliver or sell or deliver cocaine. Offenses that include inclusion of a registry such as the sex offender registry are non-expungible.

=== Ohio ===
Ohio is a "sealing" state Sealing allows eligible offenders to petition the court for the sealing of a conviction record, or the record of a case resulting in an acquittal, no-bill, or dismissal of the criminal charges. To be eligible to have a conviction sealed, one must have no pending criminal charges, and have been convicted of not more than one felony, two misdemeanors, or one felony and one misdemeanor, other than multiple offenses which arose from the same act, or that were adjudicated in the same proceeding where the criminal acts occurred within a three-month period of each other.

Minor misdemeanor convictions are not considered for purposes of determining who is an eligible offender, nor are traffic convictions except for those offenses specifically included by statute, examples of which include as driving under suspension and operating a vehicle while intoxicated. To seal the records of a conviction, a defendant must first complete all terms of the sentence imposed in the case sought to be sealed, including the payment of all fines, but exclusive of court costs and restitution obligations, and the completion of all terms of incarceration, probation, and other sanctions imposed as part of the sentence in the case.

A convicted offender is eligible to petition the sentencing court for the sealing of the records of the case after one year has passed from the date the defendant completed their sentence in a misdemeanor case or three years in cases that resulted in a felony conviction. There is no waiting period in the case of criminal proceedings that resulted in an acquittal or dismissal with prejudice, however; where a no bill is returned by a grand jury as to an individual, or the proceedings against them are dismissed without prejudice, they are ineligible to petition for the records of the case to be sealed until two years have passed from the date it was returned.

Convictions for certain offenses are ineligible for sealing, including many sexual offenses, crimes against children, felonies of the first and second degree, and offenses for which a mandatory term of imprisonment applies, however; proceedings terminated by acquittal or dismissal with prejudice are not subject to this limitation. Where a prosecution is terminated by a dismissal without prejudice, but the statute of limitations has not yet expired for every dismissed charge, the Ohio Courts of Appeal are in conflict as to whether the defendant is eligible to have the case sealed.

While the plain language of the statutes does not require the expiration of the statute of limitations prior to entry of an order sealing the records of a dismissed case, as recognized by several Ohio Courts of Appeal, at least one Appellate Court has ruled otherwise. This case has been certified as creating a conflict among the Ohio Courts of Appeal which will be resolved by the Ohio Supreme Court.

=== Oklahoma ===
Oklahoma allows for four different types of criminal records expungement under Oklahoma Statue Title 22 – Criminal Procedure. Section 18 Expungement allows for the sealing of certain nonviolent felonies and misdemeanors. These records are still accessible by court order but are sealed from the public. Expungement under Section 19a allows for the expungement of criminal history if a person was the victim of identity theft and used that stolen identity to commit a crime.

Section 60.18 Expungement allows for the expungement of Victim Protective Orders. Section 991(c) Expungement is available if a person has been given a deferred sentence and the conditions of the deferred sentence have been met. Immediate court records will be sealed under Section 991(c) but the Oklahoma State Bureau of Investigation will show that a person "plead not guilty, case dismissed."

=== Oregon ===
A person who has been arrested may petition for the set-aside of non-conviction records one year after the date of arrest, or any time following an acquittal or dismissal of charges.

For adult offenders, a conviction for a less serious, nonviolent misdemeanor or felony offense may be set aside after a waiting period of between one and twenty years, provided that the person seeking relief from the conviction has no other convictions within the most recent ten years, or arrests within the past three years. Oregon has more generous expungement policies for convictions for marijuana offenses. An order setting aside a conviction restores all rights, relieves all disabilities, and also seals records of the conviction.

Expungement and sealing of juvenile records is possible following the juvenile offender's reaching the age of 18, after a five-year waiting period.

=== Pennsylvania ===
A person may petition the court for expungement if the charge did not result in conviction at any time. When a person is convicted of a crime how they can get an expungement varies. If the charge was a summary conviction, then a person will become eligible when they are arrest and prosecution free for a period of five years. If the charges are not a summary conviction, then either the person has to be dead for three years or be older than 70 years old and been arrest or prosecution free for 10 years.

=== Tennessee ===
TCA 40-32-101 is the statute and provides some expungements at no cost. TCA 40-32-101(a)(1)(A) All public records of a person who has been charged with a misdemeanor or a felony shall, upon petition by that person to the court having jurisdiction in the previous action, be removed and destroyed without cost to the person, if: The charge has been dismissed, a no true bill was returned by a grand jury, a verdict of not guilty was returned, whether by the judge following a bench trial or by a jury, the person was arrested and released without being charged. TCA 40-32-101(a)(1)(B) A person applying for the expunction of records because the charge or warrant was dismissed in any court as a result of the successful completion of a pretrial diversion program pursuant to §§ 40-15-102 — 40-15-107, shall be charged the appropriate court clerk's fee pursuant to § 8-21-401 for destroying such records. TCA 40-32-101(a)(3) Upon petition by a defendant in the court that entered a nolle prosequi in the defendant's case, the court shall order all public records expunged. TCA 40-32-101(a)(5) All public records concerning an order of protection [ex-parte, exparte] authorized by title 36, chapter 3, part 6, which was successfully defended and denied by the court following a hearing conducted pursuant to § 36-3-605, shall, upon petition by that person to the court denying the order, be removed and destroyed without cost to the person.

=== Texas ===
Texas expungement law allows expungement of arrests which did not lead to a finding of guilt, and class C misdemeanors if the defendant received deferred adjudication, and completed community supervision. If the defendant was found guilty, pleaded guilty, or pleaded no contest to any offense other than a class "C" misdemeanor, it is not eligible for expungement; however, it may be eligible for non-disclosure if deferred adjudication was granted.

=== Utah ===
Utah's expungement is set forth in Utah Statute 77-18-2. In essence, first degree crimes cannot be expunged. Second degree forceable crimes cannot be expunged. Crimes other than those can.

=== Washington ===
Washington's expungement equivalent is called "vacating a judgment." It allows the court to vacate certain felony convictions which occurred after July 1, 1984. Revised Code of Washington (RCW) Chapter 9.94A.640 allows the court to withdraw the finding of guilt and vacate a misdemeanor or gross misdemeanor. Once vacated, or expunged, the person's criminal record will not include that case. State law gives the person the right to state to anyone, including prospective employers, that the person was not convicted of that offense, after a vacate motion has been granted.

== Caveats ==
=== Immigration ===
For purposes of immigration, unless a pardon or an expungement was granted on the basis of factual innocence, the USCIS will continue to treat an expunged or sealed record as a criminal conviction. In reviewing the character and fitness of an immigrant along the different steps from permanent residency to citizenship, United States Citizenship and Immigration Services looks to see if the petitioner has ever been convicted of a crime. Even if the immigrant was convicted, made restitution, and as part of a plea agreement had the court record expunged, that initial conviction will still appear on the immigrant's record and the immigrant may well find him/herself in deportation proceedings (as was the case of Padilla v. Kentucky (2010)). In Padilla, the U.S. Supreme Court ruled that Padilla has received ineffective assistance of counsel because he had not been warned of the possible immigration consequences of his guilty plea.

=== Security clearance ===
When applying for a state professional license or job that is considered a public office or high security (such as security guard, law enforcement, or related to national security), you may be required to disclose that you have an expunged conviction. A false denial may result in the denial of a license or security clearance.

== See also ==
- Criminal records in the United States
- Expungement
- Expungement in Texas
- Difference between record sealing and expungement
