= Tactical litigation =

Tactical litigation is a type of litigation which is not used for the normal purposes of victory on the merits, but instead, to give expression to a tactical goal. One of the most well known uses of tactical litigation, is the use of lawsuits for manufacturing delay, for example as an environmental authority to prevent a decision being taken to remove a wilderness area.
