= Inter-American Convention on Extraterritorial Validity of Foreign Judgments and Arbitral Awards =

OAS convention on enforcing judgments

Inter-American convention on extraterritorial validity of foreign judgments and arbitral awards
- Signed: 8 May 1979
- Location: Montevideo, Uruguay
- Effective: 14 June 1980
- Condition: 2 ratifications
- Signatories: 18
- Parties: 10
- Depositary: General Secretariat of the Organization of American States
- Languages: English, French, Portuguese and Spanish

The inter-American convention on extraterritorial validity of foreign judgments and arbitral awards is a convention of the Organization of American States regulating the enforcement of judgements and arbitral awards in other member states. The convention was concluded in 1979 at the Second Inter-American Specialized Conference on Private International Law and as of 2013 had 10 parties.

== Parties ==
Country	Signature	Ratification/Acceptance	Deposit of the instrument of ratification/acceptance
Argentina	1 December 1983	7 November 1983	1 December 1983
Bolivia	8 February 1983	15 May 1998	8 October 1998
Brazil	8 May 1979	31 August 1995	27 November 1995
Chile	8 May 1979		
Colombia	8 May 1979	24 June 1981	10 September 1981
Costa Rica	8 May 1979		
Dominican Republic	8 May 1979		
Ecuador	8 May 1979	5 May 1982	1 June 1982
El Salvador	11 August 1980		
Guatemala	8 May 1979		
Haiti	8 May 1979		
Honduras	8 May 1979		
Mexico	2 December 1986	11 February 1987	12 June 1987
Panama	8 May 1979		
Paraguay	8 May 1979	5 July 1985	16 August 1985
Peru	8 May 1979	9 April 1980	15 May 1980
Uruguay	8 May 1979	12 February 1980	15 May 1980
Venezuela	8 May 1979	30 January 1985	28 February 1985
