= Lis pendens =

Written notice on property that it is subject to a legal case

In United States law, a lis pendens (Latin for 'suit pending') is a written notice that a lawsuit has been filed concerning real estate, involving either the title to the property or a claimed ownership interest in it. The notice is usually filed in the county land records office. Recording a lis pendens against a piece of property alerts a potential purchaser or lender that the property’s title is in question, which makes the property less attractive to a buyer or lender. Once the notice is filed, the legal title of anyone who purchases the land or property described in the notice is subject to the outcome of the lawsuit.

== Genesis and usages ==
Lis pendens may refer to any pending lawsuit or to a specific situation with a public notice of litigation that has been recorded in the same location where the title of real property has been recorded. This notice secures a plaintiff's claim on the property so that a sale, mortgage, or encumbrance of the property will not diminish the plaintiff's rights to the property, should the plaintiff prevail in its case. In some jurisdictions, when the notice is properly recorded, lis pendens is considered constructive notice to other litigants or other unrecorded or subordinate lienholders.

The recording office will record a lis pendens upon request of anyone who claims to be entitled to do so (such as because the person has filed a lawsuit). If someone else with an interest in the property (such as the owner) believes the lis pendens is not proper, then he can then file suit to have it expunged.

Some states have lis pendens statutes which require the filer of the notice—in the event of a challenge to the notice—to establish that it has probable cause or a reasonable likelihood of success on the merits of its case in the underlying lawsuit. Other states do not have such a requirement.

Bad actors have used Lis pendens as a way of blocking legitimate real estate proceedings. An example of misuse is Kent Hovind's attempt to impede the forfeiture of his seized property.

== History ==
Under the common law, the mere existence of a lawsuit potentially affecting the title to real property had the legal effect of putting the entire world on constructive notice of the suit; anyone acquiring an interest in real property which was the subject of a pending suit took that interest subject to the litigants' rights as they might be eventually determined, no matter how much later. In effect, nothing relating to the ownership of the subject matter of the suit could be definitively changed while the suit was pending. Without publication of the existence of a lawsuit, innocent buyers might discover the existence of a lawsuit too late.

The harsh effect of this rule, and its effect on innocent purchasers, led many jurisdictions to enact lis pendens statutes requiring a written notice, usually recorded in the land records where the real estate is located, for the notice provisions of the rule to be effective. Typically, a separate recorded instrument is required by statute if the lawsuit in question affects title to real property. If the statutory requirements are met, the world is put on "constructive notice" of the existence of the suit, and any person acquiring an interest later does so subject to the outcome of the suit.

== Effect ==
Lis pendens is taken as constructive notice of the pending lawsuit, and it places a cloud on the title of the property in question until the suit is resolved and the notice released or the lis pendens is expunged. Careful buyers will be unwilling to purchase land subject to a lis pendens or will only purchase the land at a discount, prudent lenders will not lend money against the security of the land, and title insurance companies will not insure the title to such land. Title is taken subject to the outcome of the lawsuit. Because so much real property is purchased with borrowed money, this usually keeps the owner from selling the property. It also may keep the owner from borrowing money secured by the property (such as to pay the costs of defending the suit).

The presence of a lis pendens does not prevent or necessarily invalidate a transfer of the property, although it makes such a transfer subject to the outcome of the litigation. Thus, the owner is not prevented from selling the land for (non-borrowed) cash, pledging it as security for a speculative loan, or giving it away, all subject to the outcome of the lawsuit. Once the lis pendens is recorded, however, the recipient (a "purchaser" or "grantee pendente lite") would be deemed to have notice of the litigation and might lose their title to the property if the plaintiff's suit prevails.

While it is generally thought of in connection with real property (land, buildings, and the like), the doctrine of lis pendens also applies to personal property. Frequently, lis pendens statutes only apply to real property, so the common-law doctrine probably still applies to personal property.

== See also ==
- Lis alibi pendens
- Sub judice
