= Brussels Regime =

Rules regulating jurisdiction of courts

States applying Brussels regime instruments Brussels regulation, EU-Denmark agreement, Lugano Convention EU-Denmark agreement, Lugano Convention Lugano Convention Brussels regime previously applicable

The Brussels Regime is a set of rules regulating which courts have jurisdiction in legal disputes of a civil or commercial nature between individuals resident in different member states of the European Union (EU) and the European Free Trade Association (EFTA). It has detailed rules assigning jurisdiction for the dispute to be heard and governs the recognition and enforcement of foreign judgments.

== Instruments ==
Five legal instruments together form the Brussels Regime. All five legal instruments are broadly similar in content and application, with differences in their territory of application. They establish a general rule that individuals are to be sued in their state of domicile and then proceed to provide a list of exceptions. The instruments further provide for the recognition of judgments made in other countries.

=== Brussels Convention (1968) ===
Recognition and enforcement of judgments in civil and commercial cases was originally accomplished within the European Communities by the 1968 Brussels Convention, a treaty signed by the then six members of the Communities. This treaty was amended on several occasions and was almost completely superseded by a regulation adopted in 2001, the Brussels I Regulation. Today the convention only applies between the 15 pre-2004 members of the European Union and certain territories of EU member states that are outside the Union: Aruba, the French overseas territories and Mayotte. It is intended that the Brussels Convention will be replaced by the new Lugano Convention, the latter being open to accession by EU member states acting on behalf of non-European territories which belong to that member state.

=== Lugano Convention (1988) ===
In 1988, the then 12 member states of the European Communities signed a treaty, the Lugano Convention, with the then six members of the European Free Trade Association: Austria, Finland, Iceland, Norway, Sweden and Switzerland. The Lugano Convention served to extend the recognition regime to EFTA member state who are not eligible to sign the Brussels Convention. Other than the original signatories–three of which left EFTA to join the EU in 1995–only Poland has subsequently acceded to the Lugano Convention. Liechtenstein, the only state to accede to the EFTA after 1988, has not signed either the 1988 Convention or its successor, the 2007 Lugano Convention. The convention is fully superseded by a 2007 version.

=== Brussels I Regulation (2001) ===
Regulation (EC) No 44/2001
- European Union regulation
- Title: Council Regulation on jurisdiction and the recognition and enforcement of judgments in civil and commercial matters
- Made by: Council
- Made under: Article 61(c) and Article 67(1) TEC
- Journal reference: L012, 16 January 2001, pp. 1-23

History
- Date made: 22 December 2000
- Entry into force: 1 March 2002

Other legislation
- Replaced by: (EU) No 1215/2012
- Recast with new legislation

The Brussels I Regulation of 2001 was the primary piece of legislation in the Brussels framework from 2002 until January 2015. It substantially replaced the 1968 Brussels Convention, and applied to all EU member states excluding Denmark, which has a full opt-out from implementing regulations under the area of freedom, security and justice. It came into effect on 1 March 2002. The regulation is fully superseded by a recast Brussels I regulation.

=== Agreement with Denmark ===
In 2005, Denmark signed an international agreement with the European Community to apply the provisions of the 2001 Regulation between the EU and Denmark. The 2005 agreement applies a modified form of the 2001 Regulation between Denmark and the rest of the EU. It also provides a procedure by which amendments to the regulation are to be implemented by Denmark. It applies the 2001 regulation to Denmark and other EU members from 1 July 2007. Should Denmark decide not to implement any change to the Regulation or its successor, then the Agreement ends automatically.

=== Lugano Convention (2007) ===
In 2007, the European Community and Denmark signed with Iceland, Switzerland and Norway the new Lugano Convention. This treaty was intended to replace both the old Lugano Convention of 1988 and the Brussels Convention and as such was open to signature to EFTA member states and to accession to EU member states on behalf of their extra-EU territories. While the former purpose was achieved in 2011 with the ratification of all EFTA member states (except for Liechtenstein which never signed the 1988 Convention nor the 2007 Convention), no EU member state has yet acceded to the convention on behalf of its extra-EU territories.

The 2007 Convention is substantially the same as the 2001 Brussels I Regulation: the main difference being that the word "Regulation" is replaced with the word "Convention" throughout the text. Furthermore, the convention has a slightly different definition of the concept "court" and the 2007 convention is not adapted to the recast of the Brussels Regulation. It is also open to accession by other EFTA states as well as EU states acting on behalf of territories which are not part of the EU. Other states may join subject to approval of the present parties to the treaty. No accessions have taken place so far, but the Kingdom of the Netherlands planned to present to parliament an approval act for accession on behalf of Aruba, Caribbean Netherlands, Curaçao and possibly Sint Maarten in 2014.

=== Brussels I Regulation (recast) ===
Regulation (EU) No 1215/2012
- European Union regulation
- Title: Regulation on jurisdiction and the recognition and enforcement of judgments in civil and commercial matters (recast)
- Made by: European Parliament and Council
- Made under: Article 67(4) and points (a), (c) and (e) of Article 81(2) TFEU
- Journal reference: L351, 20 December 2012, pp. 1-32

History
- Date made: 12 December 2012
- Entry into force: 1 January 2013
- Implementation date: 10 January 2015

Other legislation
- Replaces: Regulation (EC) No 44/2001
- Amended by: Regulation (EU) No 542/2014

An amendment to the Brussels I Regulation, covering maintenance obligations, was adopted in 2008. Neither Denmark nor the United Kingdom participated in the regulation, though Denmark notified the Commission of its acceptance of the amendment in January 2009.

In 2012, the EU institutions adopted a recast Brussels I Regulation, which replaced the 2001 regulation with effect from 10 January 2015. The recast regulation promotes the "free movement of judgments" within the EU, and now also applies to jurisdiction regarding non-EU residents. It abolishes formalities for recognition of judgments and simplifies the procedure for a court chosen by the parties to commence proceedings (even if proceedings have started in another member state already). In December 2012 Denmark notified the Commission of its decision to implement the contents of 2012 regulation. The Lugano Convention Standing committee considered amending the Lugano Convention in accordance with the recast, but "made no recommendation on the possible amendment of the Lugano Convention and did not decide on any further steps."

In 2014, the EU amended the Brussels I Regulation to clarify provisions regarding two courts which are "common to several member states": the Unified Patent Court and the Benelux Court of Justice jurisdiction. Denmark again notified the EU that it would apply the amendments. The Lugano Convention Standing Committee considered amending the Lugano Convention with respect to the unitary patent and Unified patent court, but decided to "wait for the results of further study".

== Scope and content ==
The Brussels Regime covers legal disputes of a civil or commercial nature. In 1978, the convention was amended to include the sentence: "It shall not extend, in particular, to revenue, customs or administrative matters." The 2012 Regulation further specifies that the regulation shall not extend to "the liability of the State for acts and omissions in the exercise of State authority (acta iure imperii)." There are some exceptions limiting the scope of this. Where the principal matter of a dispute is one of family law, bankruptcy or insolvency, social security, or relates to arbitration, the case is not subject to the rules.

The regulation aims at jurisdiction, i.e., determining which court or courts will have the ability to take the case. That does not mean that the applicable law will be the law of the court. It is possible and frequent to have a national court applying foreign law. In general, it is the domicile of the defendant that determines which of the courts have jurisdiction in a given case.

The regime prescribes that, subject to specific rules set out in the various instruments, a person (legal or natural) may only be sued in the member state in which he or she has its habitual residence or domicile. This is determined by the law of the court hearing the case, so that a person can be domiciled in more than one state simultaneously. However, "domicile" does not have the same meaning as that given to it by common law.

Article 4 also allows a person domiciled in any member state to take advantage of another member state's exorbitant bases of jurisdiction on the same basis as a national of that state. This is useful in cases where a member state, such as France, allows its nationals to sue anyone in their courts, so that someone domiciled in a member state like Finland may sue someone domiciled in a non-member state like Canada, in the courts of a third party member state, like France, where the defendant may have assets.

The Brussels Convention and the Brussels I Regulation are both subject to the jurisdiction of the European Court of Justice (ECJ, now known as CJEU) on questions of interpretation. The Lugano Convention does not require non-EU states to refer questions of interpretation to the ECJ, but has a protocol regarding "uniform interpretation" of the convention, requiring courts "pay due account to the principles laid down by any relevant decision" and allowing for the exchange of relevant judgments. Nevertheless, various divergences have arisen between member states in the interpretation of the Lugano Convention.

The Brussels Regime generally allows jurisdiction clauses in contracts, which preserves the right of parties to reach agreement at the time of contracting as to which court should govern any dispute. After the 2012 regulation enters into force, such a decision should in principle be respected, even if a court outside the Brussels Regime states is selected and is in compliance with the 2005 Hague Choice of Court convention.

== Application ==
=== Public policy clauses ===
Article 27(1) of the Brussels Convention and Article 34(1) of the Brussels Regulation both contain public policy clauses (or "public policy exceptions") which state that judgments should not be recognised "if such recognition is contrary to public policy in the State in which recognition is sought".

=== Effect in the UK ===
Until 1 February 2020 all instruments applied in the UK as a result of its EU membership. Under the conditions of the Brexit withdrawal agreement, the instruments remained applicable there, despite Brexit, during a transition period until 1 January 2021.

The UK has sought participation in the Lugano Convention after Brexit, and has secured support from Iceland, Norway and Switzerland for accession. As of January 2021, the accession had not been approved. In May 2021, the European Commission reported to the European Parliament its view that the European Union should not give consent to the accession of the UK, arguing that "the consistent policy of the European Union (with regard to third-countries) is to promote cooperation within the framework of the multilateral Hague Conventions".

=== Effect in Gibraltar ===
The Brussels Convention of 1968 (as amended) applied between the UK and Gibraltar before Brexit and, in modified form, still applies today.

== See also ==
- Spider in the web doctrine – Legal doctrine in Dutch patent law
- Cross-border injunction – Injunction with pan-EU effect
- Enforcement of European patents – Enforcement only on a per-country basis
- Inter-American convention on extraterritorial validity of foreign judgments and arbitral awards – OAS convention on enforcing judgments
- Rome Convention – Choice of law in contract disputes

Implementation in UK law:

- Civil Jurisdiction and Judgments Act 1982 – Act transposing 1968 Brussels Convention
- Civil Jurisdiction and Judgments Act 1991 – Act transposing 1988 Lugano Convention
