= Patent law in Aruba =

Patent law in Aruba is mainly governed by the Patents Regulation (Dutch: Octrooiverordening, formally: landsverordening houdende regels met betrekking tot octrooien), the law governing the Aruban patent. The Dutch government indicated in 2007, that the patent regulation was, to a large extent (and with the exception of provisions regarding European patents) identical to the Rijksoctrooiwet.

== Aruban patent ==
The patent term in Aruba is 20 years, and also a short-term patent is available with a duration of 6 years. Inventions have to fulfill 3 requirements to be patentable: they have to be new, inventive and industrially applicable. and an International Search (or similar investigation regarding the state of the art) has to be requested for the 20-years' patent. The Aruban patent is a registration patent and thus granted if the application is clear and formal requirements are fulfilled, even if the search results in concerns regarding novelty or inventively.

Patent applications can be submitted in Dutch, English, Papiamentu or Spanish. Patents can be licensed and such license has effect against third parties only after registration with the Intellectual property office. The regulation provides for the grant of compulsory licenses in the public interest if the patent owner refuses to grant a licence The grant of compulsory licenses to the Kingdom in wartime however is governed by the Rijksoctrooiwet.

== History ==
Aruba is a "country" (Dutch: land) within the Kingdom of the Netherlands, and was until 1986 one of the six islands constituting former "country" the Netherlands Antilles. In the Kingdom, patents are regulated by the "Kingdom patents act" (Dutch: Rijksoctrooiwet), which governs the Dutch patent and the legal effect of European patents in the Netherlands (the latter never applied in Aruba). However, as IP-law falls within the competence of the individual countries, Aruba decided to create the Aruban patent from 1 April 1995 and render patent applications for the Dutch patent inapplicable.

== Treaties ==
Aruba can not be a party to patent treaties itself, but the Kingdom is party to several treaties, also with respect to Aruba. This is the case for the Paris convention, which allows for claiming priority of up to 1 year from an earlier patent application in a Paris convention country. The Patent Cooperation Treaty also applies on Aruba, and the Bureau of Intellectual property acts as a receiving office for international (PCT) applications. However, as the Kingdom of the Netherlands has "closed its national route", it is -also in Aruba- not possible to designate the Aruban patent at the end of the international phase. Since 1987, the Convention on the Unification of Certain Points of Substantive Law on Patents for Invention, which harmonised patent law in several European states applies.

Aruba also uses the IPC system; the Strasbourg Agreement Concerning the International Patent Classification applies. Regarding deposit of microorganisms, the Budapest Treaty applies.

In addition the patent law treaty and the European Patent Convention, have been approved for Aruba, but a declaration regarding application with respect to Aruba has not been with the depositaries, and these treaties thus do not have effect.

== Litigation ==
Although patents are granted without a substantial examination, the court is competent to decide issues regarding validity, in addition to (amongst others) disputes regarding infringement, ownership and licenses. One decision (ECLI:NL:OGEAA:2011:BQ6331, of the Court of First Instance of Aruba) regarding an Aruban patent is published at the case law database of the Dutch judiciary.
