= List of awards and nominations received by Michael Stuhlbarg =

Michael Stuhlbarg awards and nominations
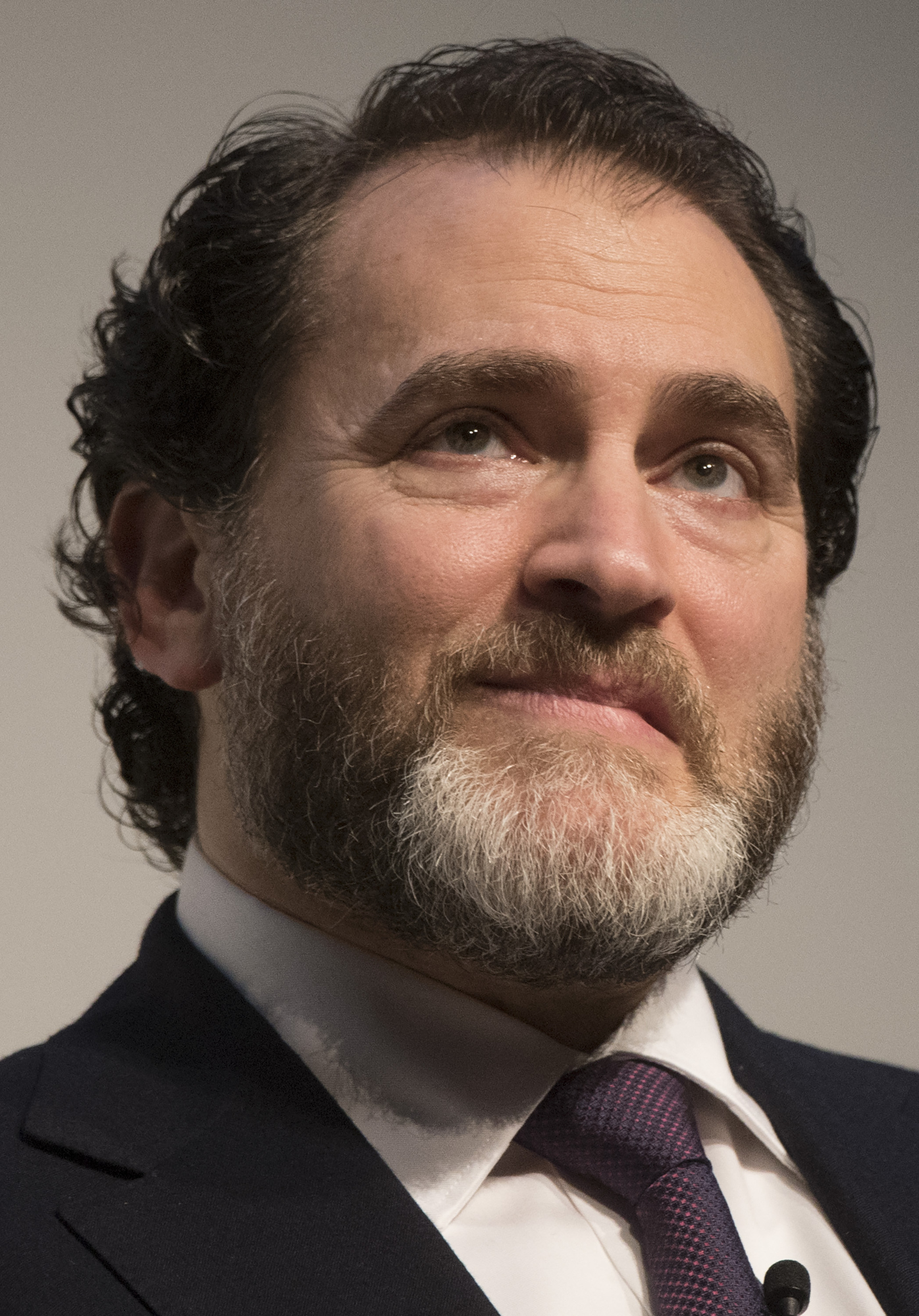
- Stuhlbarg in 2018
Awards and nominations
Award	Wins	Nominations
Critics' Choice Awards	0	2
Emmy Awards	0	2
Golden Globes	0	1
Screen Actors Guild Awards	2	5
Tony Awards	0	2

Totals (Note: Certain award groups do not simply award one winner. They acknowledge several different recipients, have runners-up, and have third place. Since this is a specific recognition and is different from losing an award, runner-up mentions are considered wins in this award tally. For simplification and to avoid errors, each award in this list has been presumed to have had a prior nomination.)
- Wins: 10
- Nominations: 38

Michael Stuhlbarg is American actor known for his character roles on stage and screen.

He received a Golden Globe Award nomination and numerous critics awards for his leading performance in the Coen Brothers' A Serious Man (2009). He has received a Primetime Emmy Award nominations for Outstanding Supporting Actor – Limited Series for Hulu series The Looming Tower (2018), and Dopesick (2021). He has also received five Screen Actors Guild Award nominations winning twice for Outstanding Ensemble in a Drama Series for the HBO series Boardwalk Empire.

He received a Drama Desk Award and a Tony Award nomination for Best Featured Actor in a Play for his performance in Martin McDonagh's The Pillowman in 2005. For the play The Voysey Inheritance he received the Obie Award, and the Joe A. Callaway Award as well as a Drama Desk Award nomination.

== Major associations ==
=== Critics' Choice Awards ===
Year	Category	Nominated work	Result	Ref.
2017	Best Supporting Actor	Call Me by Your Name	Nominated	
2018	Best Acting Ensemble	The Post	Nominated	

=== Tony Awards ===
Year	Category	Nominated work	Result	Ref.
2005	Best Featured Actor in a Play	The Pillowman	Nominated	
2024	Best Leading Actor in a Play	Patriots	Nominated	

=== Emmy Awards ===
Year	Category	Nominated work	Result	Ref.
Primetime Emmy Awards
2018	Outstanding Supporting Actor in a Limited or Anthology Series or Movie	The Looming Tower	Nominated	
2022	Outstanding Supporting Actor in a Limited or Anthology Series or Movie	Dopesick	Nominated	

=== Golden Globe Awards ===
Year	Category	Nominated work	Result	Ref.
2009	Best Actor – Motion Picture Musical or Comedy	A Serious Man	Nominated	

=== Screen Actors Guild Awards ===
Year	Category	Nominated work	Result	Ref.
2010	Outstanding Performance by an Ensemble in a Drama Series	Boardwalk Empire	Won	
2011	Outstanding Performance by an Ensemble in a Drama Series	Boardwalk Empire	Won	
2012	Outstanding Performance by an Ensemble in a Drama Series	Boardwalk Empire	Nominated	
2013	Outstanding Performance by an Ensemble in a Drama Series	Boardwalk Empire	Nominated	
2015	Outstanding Performance by a Cast in a Motion Picture	Trumbo	Nominated	

== Theatre awards ==
=== Drama Desk Award ===
Year	Category	Nominated work	Result	Ref.
2005	Outstanding Featured Actor in a Play	The Pillowman	Won	

=== Lucille Lortel Award ===
Year	Category	Nominated work	Result	Ref.
2006	Outstanding Lead Actor in a Play	Measure for Pleasure	Nominated	
2007	Outstanding Lead Actor in a Play	The Voysey Inheritance	Nominated	

=== Obie Award ===
Year	Category	Nominated work	Result	Ref.
2006	Distinguished Performance by an Actor	The Voysey Inheritance	Won	

=== Joe A. Callaway Award ===
Year	Category	Nominated work	Result	Ref.
2006	Best Actor	The Voysey Inheritance	Won	

== Critics awards ==
Film awards

Year	Award	Category	Nominated work	Result
2009	Independent Spirit Award	Robert Altman Award	A Serious Man	Won
2009	Gotham Award	Best Ensemble Performance	A Serious Man	Nominated
2009	Santa Barbara International Film Festival	Virtuoso Award	A Serious Man	Won
2009	Chicago Film Critics Association	Best Actor	A Serious Man	Nominated
2009	London Film Critics Circle	Best Actor of the Year	A Serious Man	Nominated
2009	San Diego Film Critics Society	Best Performance by an Ensemble	A Serious Man	Nominated
2009	Satellite Award	Best Actor – Musical or Comedy	A Serious Man	Won
2012	Boston Society of Film Critics	Best Cast	Seven Psychopaths	Nominated
2012	San Diego Film Critics Society	Best Ensemble Performance	Seven Psychopaths	Nominated
2017	Astra Film Awards	Best Supporting Actor	Call Me by Your Name	Won
2017	Chicago Film Critics Association	Best Supporting Actor	Call Me by Your Name	Nominated
2017	Detroit Film Critics Society	Best Supporting Actor	Call Me by Your Name	Nominated
2017	National Society of Film Critics	Best Supporting Actor	Call Me by Your Name	Nominated
2017	San Francisco Film Critics Circle	Best Supporting Actor	Call Me by Your Name	Nominated
2017	Washington D.C. Area Film Critics Association	Best Supporting Actor	Call Me by Your Name	Nominated
2017	San Diego Film Critics Society	for Body of Work	Call Me by Your Name	Won
2017	National Society of Film Critics	Best Supporting Actor	The Shape of Water	Nominated
2017	National Society of Film Critics	Best Supporting Actor	The Post	Nominated
2017	San Diego Film Critics Society	Best Ensemble	The Post	Nominated
2017	Detroit Film Critics Society	for Best Ensemble	The Post	Won
2017	Seattle Film Critics Society	for Best Ensemble	The Post	Nominated
2017	Washington D.C. Area Film Critics Association	Best Ensemble	The Post	Nominated
