= Zariba =

Fence made of thorns

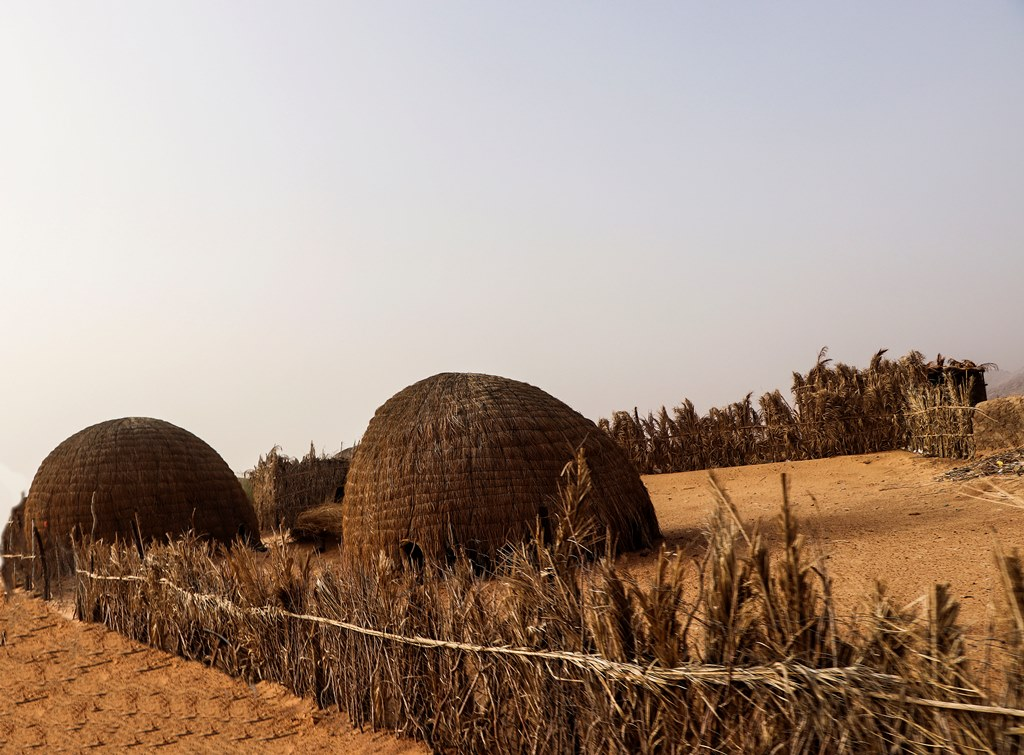
Two tikitts enclosed by a zariba in Mhaïreth

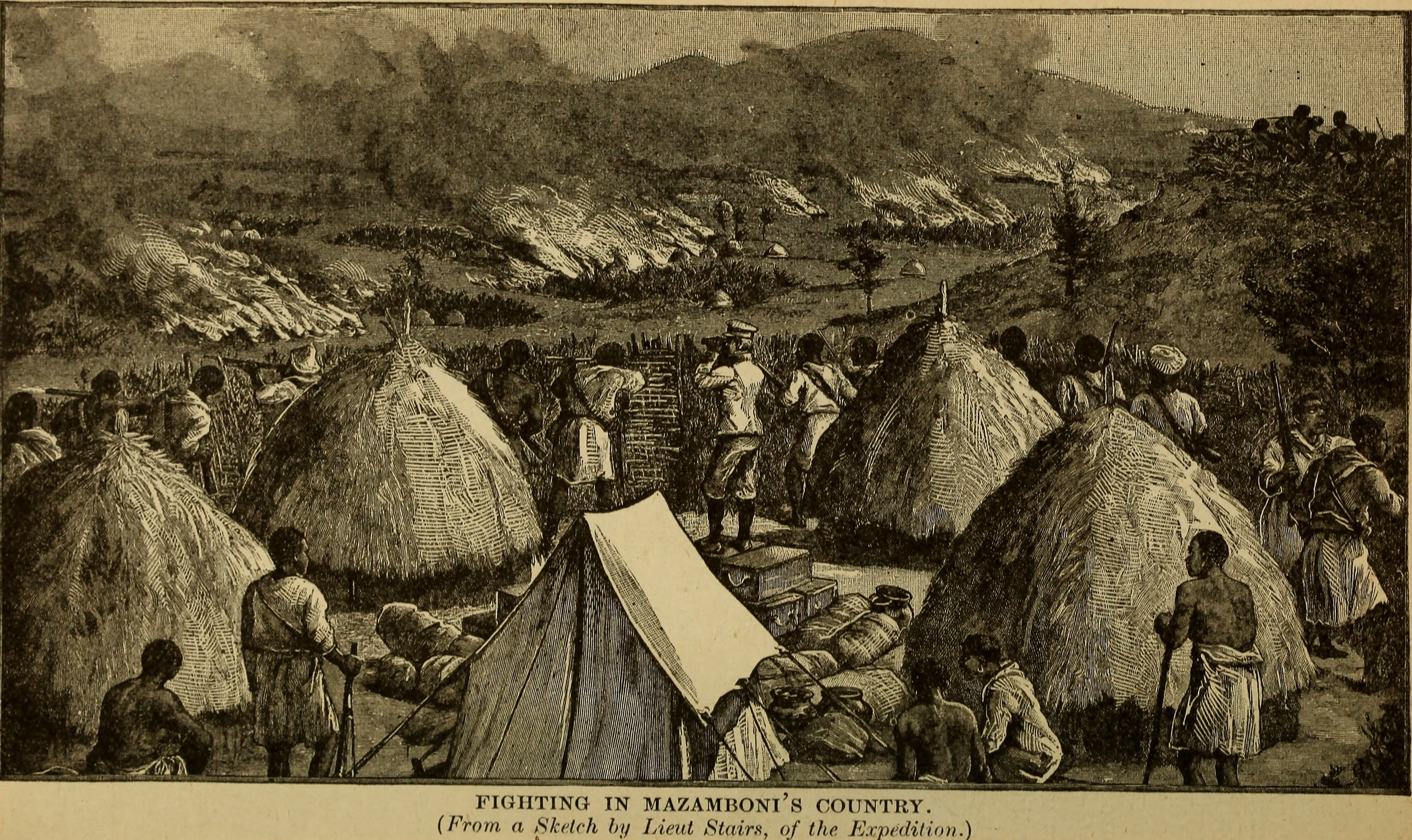
Soldiers (centre) standing behind a zariba which protects a village in Democratic Republic of the Congo during the time of Henry Morton Stanley's Emin Pasha Relief Expedition in 1890

A zariba (from Arabic: زَرِيْـبَـة, romanized: zarībah, lit. 'cattle-pen') is a fence which is made of thorns. Historically, it was used to defend settlements or property against perpetrators in Sudan and neighboring countries such as Chad and further south in Democratic Republic of the Congo.

An example would be as a pen to protect cattle and other livestock from predators such as lions, albeit often unsuccessfully.

== See also ==
- Boma (enclosure)
- Compound (enclosure)
- Kraal
- Stockade
