= Compound (fortification) =

Type of fortification

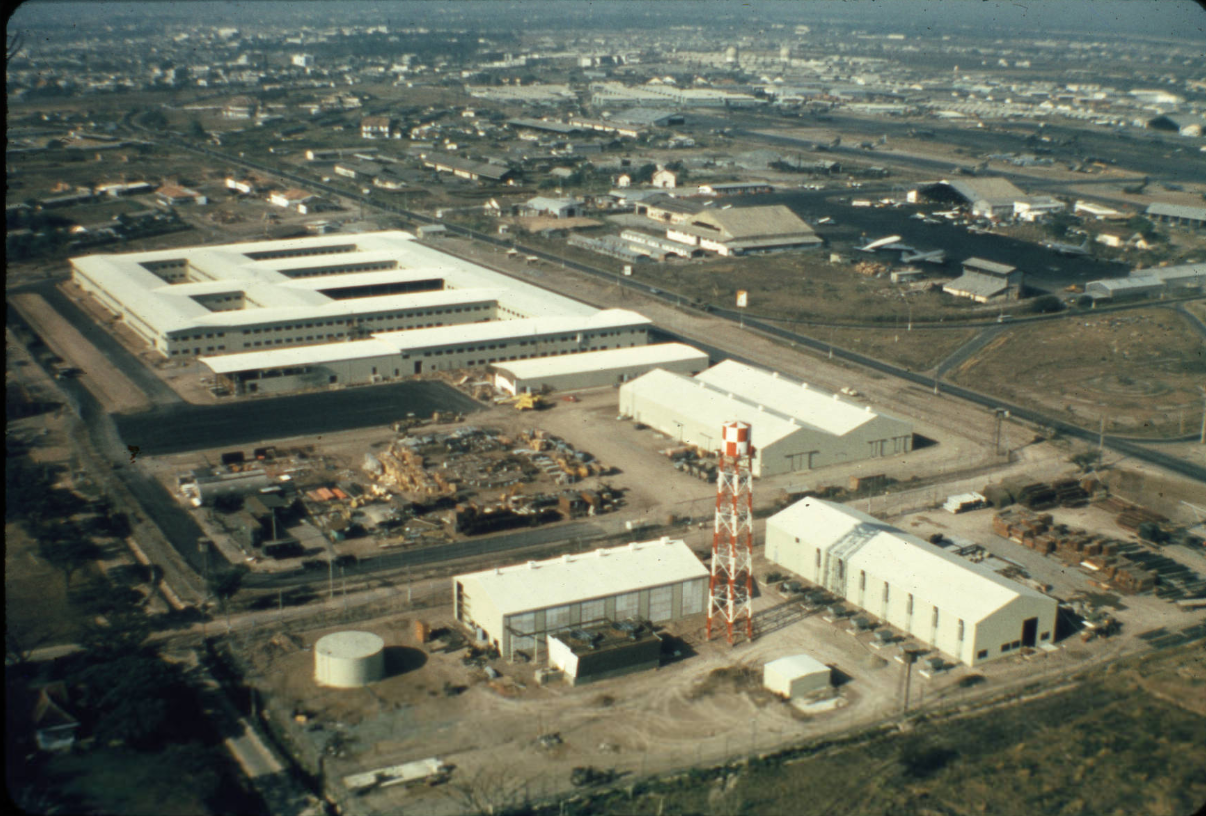
MACV HQ complex at Tan Son Nhut, Vietnam.

In military science, a compound is a type of fortification made up of walls or fences surrounding several buildings in the center of a large piece of land. The walls can either serve the purpose of being tall, thick, and impenetrable, in which case they would be made of wood, stone, or some other like substance; or dangerous to attempt to scale, in which case they could be made of barbed wire or electrified. Compounds can be designed to double as living spaces and military structures in the middle of hostile territory or as a military area within a country's territory; they are also used by civilians and government officials (IE: Embassies) and those who want to protect against threats to themselves or their property.

A number of survivalists own fortified compound-like structures as a means of protection in case civilization breaks down or their government becomes abusive.

The term compound is also used to refer to an unfortified enclosure, especially in Africa and Asia. See compound (enclosure).

== Specific group usage ==
Insurgent, militant, and terrorist groups alike have been known to maintain their own compounds which commonly feature training camps. The CSA, Al-Qaeda, various Ku Klux Klan factions, The Taliban, Aggressive Christianity Missionary Training Corps and ISIS are some of the organizations who use such.

Large outlaw motorcycle clubs will typically use a compound for a particular chapter's headquarters. In motorcycle subculture, these are commonly referred to as "clubhouses".

Many new religious movement organizations and cults have used compounds to facilitate their own privatized practices or activities. Additionally, they can serve as a residency for followers of that particular commune. Mount Carmel Center, Tama-Re, YFZ Ranch, and Gold Base are some of the most notable of these.

Due to their offensive imagery and paraphernalia, large neo-Nazi and white supremacist groups will operate secluded compounds that can serve as a headquarters for a certain organization. In this particular movement, they are also used to hold gatherings and serve as venues for Nazi punk, Rock Against Communism and White power music concerts. The most famous of these would be the now-defunct Aryan Nations compound in Hayden Lake, Idaho.

== Other examples ==
- Murphy Ranch - a now-defunct compound that belonged to the Silver Legion of America; designed for the group's Nazi activities in the United States during WWII.
- The Knights of the KKK currently operate a compound within Zinc, Arkansas.
- The headquarters of Imperial Klans of America consists of a heavily guarded 28-acre compound in Dawson Springs, Kentucky.
- Elohim City
- Bab al-Azizia
- Camp Nordland
- Osama bin Laden's compound in Abbottabad
- Camp Siegfried

== See also ==
- List of cities with defensive walls
- Border barrier
- Separation barrier
- Closed city
- Stockade
- Boma (enclosure)
- Compound (enclosure)
- Gated community
- Blockhouse
