= Nguni homestead =

Small African settlement

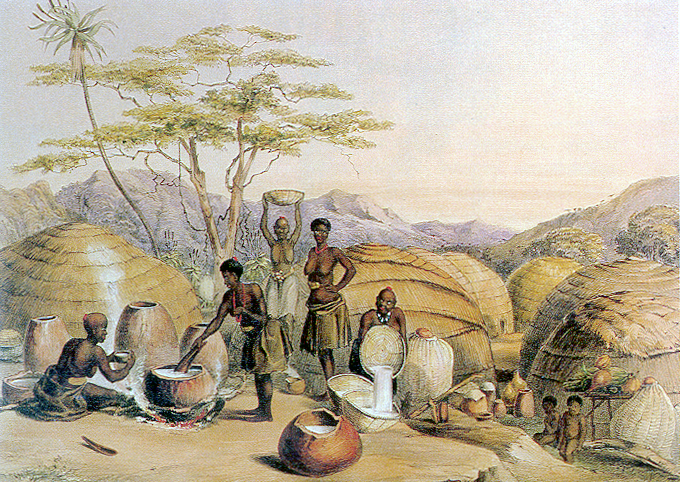
Beer-brewing at a Zulu umuzi, c. 1849.

A homestead (Xhosa: umzi) in southern Africa is a cluster of several houses, typically occupied by a single extended family and often with an attached kraal. Such settlements are characteristic of Nguni-speaking peoples. A house within a homestead is known as an indlu, plural tindlu (Swati) or izindlu (Xhosa and Zulu).

Traditional housing is a feature of rural communities across southern Africa. A rural community may live in a homestead built using locally sourced materials. In South Africa, as of 2022, 4.3% of households were classified as traditional dwellings. Modern homesteads may make use of commercially available materials but nonetheless inherit traditional construction methods to retain an often semi-circular arrangement of vernacular architecture. For example, among Xhosa, the roofs of a main rondavel (Xhosa, indlu enkulu) may be constructed of sheet metal, rather than thatch.

== Traditional relevance ==
Archaeologists have demonstrated that the physical organization of the south-eastern Bantu residential unit has been continuous for perhaps a thousand years. The forms of traditional living and societal organization influence each other, including through the homestead. British anthropologist Adam Kuper posits the political systems of the Zulu Kingdom of the early 19th century took organizational influence from the homestead as social unit, which was one based around the traditional pan-Nguni homestead. This system, common among northern Nguni groups, inspired strategies of political organization, succession, and military regiments. He offers, for example, the prominence of spacial division (left-right) as being reflected in the Zulu regiment’s classification, with those quartered rightmost always of higher status than the left. Similar divisions in royal settlements were structured dualistically.

== Historic societal function ==
Debates over the historicity of a general structure of the homestead and its use determining ethnographic and archeological significance makes characterizations on form and function difficult. Zulu homesteads are typically the standard analog for Nguni homesteads, embodying their spatial, social, and hierarchical organization. This effect is in part due to studies by anthropologists who have contributed prominent ethnographic data on Zulu settlements, such as Eileen Krige, William David Hammond-Tooke, Nicolaas van Warmelo, and James Stewart.

Regardless, the homestead in general has traditionally retained different military, agricultural and social significance across ethnic groups. Various styles of organization have been identified across southern Africa and associated with Northern and Southern Nguni, Sotho-Tswana, Ndebele, Swazi and Ngoni variations, including differentiation between (Zulu) umuzi and ikhanda homesteads.

== See also ==
- Compound (enclosure)
- Boma (enclosure)
