= David Grimm (writer) =

American playwright (born 1965)

- Born: 1965 (age 60–61); Oberlin, Ohio
- Education: Tisch School of the Arts (NYU); Sarah Lawrence
- Occupation: Playwright
- Writing career
- Notable works: Measure for Pleasure; Kit Marlowe

David Grimm (born c. 1965) is an American playwright and screenwriter.

== Background ==
Grimm was born in 1965 in Oberlin, Ohio, where both his parents were professors at Oberlin College. Upon their divorce when Grimm was age five, he moved with his mother and sister to Israel, until he was age 11. His family then continually relocated throughout Europe, as his mother's teaching job demanded, before Grimm ultimately returned to Oberlin to live with his father and finish high school. In 1983, Grimm moved to New York to attend college at Sarah Lawrence and, later, graduate school at New York University's Tisch School of the Arts. From there, he took residency in New Dramatists.

== Plays ==
Tales of Red Vienna received its world premiere at The Manhattan Theatre Company on March 18, 2014. The production was directed by Kate Whoriskey, starring Nina Arianda, Tina Benko, Kathleen Chalfant, Michael Esper, Michael Goldsmith and Lucas Hall.

The Miracle at Naples received its world premiere at The Huntington Theatre Company in Boston in April 2009. The production was directed by Huntington artistic director Peter Dubois, starring Dick Latessa, Alma Cuervo, and Lucy Devitto.

Steve & Idi was developed at the Sundance Theatre Lab and is the first play from Rattlestick's DirtyWorks reading series to have a full production. The play received its world premiere at Rattlestick Playwrights Theater in New York City in April 2008 in which Grimm played Steve to the Idi of Evan Parke.

Chick is based on the book Magician of the Modern by Eugene R. Gaddis and was commissioned by Hartford Stage as part of the Hartford Heritage Project. The play received its world premiere at Hartford Stage in 2007 starring Robbie Sella and his wife, Enid Graham.

Measure for Pleasure received its world premiere in March 2006 at The Public Theater in New York City. The production was directed by Peter DuBois, starring Wayne Knight, Michael Stuhlbarg, Euan Morton, and Suzanne Bertish.

The Learned Ladies of Park Avenue received its world premiere at Hartford Stage in September 2005 directed by artistic director Michael Wilson.

The Savages of Hartford was commissioned by The Public Theater/NY Shakespeare Festival.

Kit Marlowe received its world premiere at The Public Theater in November 2000, starring Christian Camargo, Sam Trammell, and Keith David.

Sheridan, or Schooled in Scandal received its world premiere at the La Jolla Playhouse in San Diego, California, in July 2000. The production was directed by Mark Brokaw.

edgar was the winner of the 1996 Julie Harris Playwright's Award and the 1996 Panowski Award.

Killing Hilda was produced by Blue Moon Productions in 1999.

== Appearances ==
Originally taped in December 2007, Grimm joined a panel of playwrights on American Theatre Wing's Working in the Theatre. Grimm, Carlyle Brown, Quiara Alegría Hudes, and Lucy Thurber talked about their differing styles of playwriting, what inspired them to start writing, how the world of the playwright has evolved and changed and what influences their writing and the challenges in getting their work produced.
