= Michael Stuhlbarg =

American actor (born 1968)

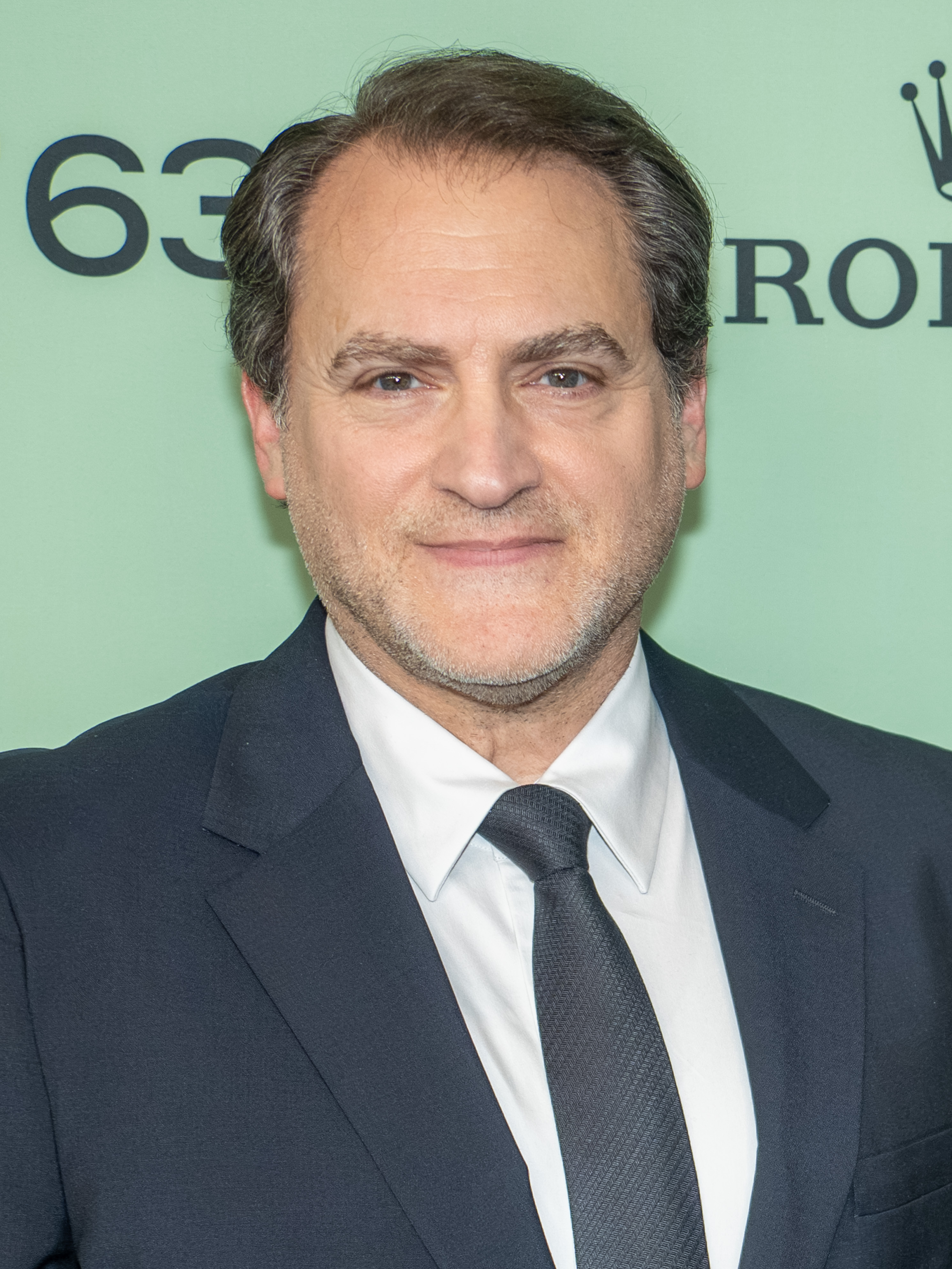
- Stuhlbarg at the 2025 New York Film Festival
- Born: July 5, 1968 (age 58); Long Beach, California, U.S.
- Education: Juilliard School (BFA)
- Occupation: Actor
- Years active: 1992–present
- Spouse: Mai-Linh Lofgren (m. 2013)
- Awards: Full list

Michael Stuhlbarg (/ˈstuːlˌbɑːrɡ/ STOOL-barg; born July 5, 1968) is an American actor. Known for his character roles on stage and screen, he has received numerous accolades, including a Drama Desk Award, an Obie Award, and two Screen Actors Guild Awards, in addition to nominations for two Tony Awards, two Emmy Awards, and a Golden Globe Award.

He rose to prominence playing a troubled university professor in Joel and Ethan Coen's dark comedy film A Serious Man (2009). Stuhlbarg has portrayed real life figures, such as George Yeaman in Lincoln (2012), Lew Wasserman in Hitchcock (2012), Andy Hertzfeld in Steve Jobs (2015), Edward G. Robinson in Trumbo (2015), Abe Rosenthal in The Post (2017), and Stanley Edgar Hyman in Shirley (2020). He has also acted in Hugo (2011), Men in Black 3 (2012), Blue Jasmine (2013), Arrival (2016), Call Me by Your Name and The Shape of Water (both 2017), and Bones and All (2022). He joined the Marvel Cinematic Universe playing Nicodemus West in Doctor Strange (2016) and its 2022 sequel.

On television, he portrayed Arnold Rothstein in HBO's Boardwalk Empire (2010–2013), Richard A. Clarke in The Looming Tower (2018), and Richard Sackler in Dopesick (2021), receiving Primetime Emmy Award for Outstanding Supporting Actor in a Limited or Anthology Series or Movie nominations for the latter two. He also acted in FX's Fargo (2017), Showtime's Your Honor (2020–2023), and HBO's The Staircase (2022).

On stage, Stuhlbarg made his Broadway debut in the revival of the George Bernard Shaw play Saint Joan (1993). He earned Tony Award nominations for Best Featured Actor in a Play for his role as a traumatized man in Martin McDonagh's The Pillowman (2005) and Best Actor in a Play for his portrayal of Boris Berezovsky in Peter Morgan's Patriots (2024).

== Early life and education ==
Stuhlbarg was born on July 5, 1968, in Long Beach, California, the son of Susan and Mort Stuhlbarg. His father had been a salesman, becoming a successful manufacturer of security products. He was raised as a Reform Jew. He has said, "It's more of a spiritual resonance as opposed to particularly of Judaism." Stuhlbarg trained at the Juilliard School in New York City, where he was a member of the Drama Division's Group 21 (1988–1992). He graduated from Juilliard with a Bachelor of Fine Arts degree in 1992.

Stuhlbarg also studied acting at the University of California, Los Angeles, the Lithuanian Academy of Music and Theatre in Lithuania, the British American Drama Academy at Oxford, and the National Youth Theatre of Great Britain at the University of London. He also studied mime with Marcel Marceau.

== Career ==
=== 1993–2005 ===
Stuhlbarg began his career appearing in stage productions. In a 1993 production of Saint Joan, Stuhlbarg portrayed Charles VII of France; however, UPI critic Frederick M. Winship thought that Stuhlbarg was miscast in the production. The following year, he portrayed the title character in a production of Richard II. Writing for The New York Times, theater critic David Richards dubbed Stuhlbarg a "promising young actor", yet felt his portrayal of Richard came across as a "blend of Rasputin and an odious rent collector is altogether unavoidable, but I'd like to believe it's not his fault." He starred in the two character play Old Wicked Songs throughout late 1995. For his role in the 1996 production of the Eugene O'Neill play Long Day's Journey into Night, Stuhlbarg won the Elliot Norton Award for Outstanding Actor in a large company production. In a 1997 production of Henry VIII, Stuhlbarg played multiple roles, including Thomas Cranmer.

Stuhlbarg made his film debut in the 1998 drama A Price Above Rubies, which starred Renée Zellweger. In the 1999 Studio 54 production of the musical Cabaret, Stuhlbarg played Ernst Ludwig, a German who in the course of the production is revealed to be a Nazi. Stuhlbarg played the dual role of both Time and Clown in a 2000 production of William Shakespeare's The Winter's Tale; The New York Press critic Jonathan Kalb praised his "endearing stutter and hopping gait". In the Tim Blake Nelson-directed war drama The Grey Zone (2001), Stuhlbarg played a Jewish Hungarian who becomes a Sonderkommando in the Nazi Germany Auschwitz-Birkenau extermination camp. Stuhlbarg had previously appeared in the play of the same name by Nelson in 1996. Following appearances in productions of Cymbeline, Twelfth Night, and The Persians, Stuhlbarg gave a critically acclaimed performance in the 2005 Broadway production of the Martin McDonagh play The Pillowman. He played Michal, a mentally damaged man who has suffered years of abuse from his parents, and gained 50 pounds for the role. Ben Brantley of The New York Times praised Stuhlbarg for "boldly and expertly" capturing "both the innocence and ugliness of Michal". Stuhlbarg won a Drama Desk Award for Outstanding Featured Actor in a Play and received his first Tony Award nomination for his performance.

=== 2006–2013 ===
In 2006, Stuhlbarg appeared in the plays Measure for Pleasure and The Voysey Inheritance. He played a recurring role on Aaron Sorkin's television series Studio 60 on the Sunset Strip from 2006 to 2007, which aired for one season. His first film appearance of 2008 was the independent drama Afterschool, in which he played a "sanctimonious" high school principal and he had a one-line scene in Ridley Scott's Body of Lies as a lawyer. Also in 2008, Stuhlbarg portrayed Prince Hamlet in Oskar Eustis' production of William Shakespeare's Hamlet at the Delacorte Theater. In August of that year, Stuhlbarg was cast as the lead character in the Coen brothers film A Serious Man. The dark comedy, in which he portrayed troubled Jewish university professor Larry Gopnik, was released in October 2009. In his review of the film, Chicago Sun-Times critic Roger Ebert felt that "Much of the success of A Serious Man comes from the way Michael Stuhlbarg plays the role. He doesn't play Gopnik as a sad-sack or a loser, a whiner or a depressive, but as a hopeful man who can't believe what's happening to him. He was nominated for Golden Globe Award for Best Actor – Motion Picture Musical or Comedy for his performance in the film. Cold Souls, his other release of 2009, featured Stuhlbarg in a smaller role as a hedge fund consultant, and he also guest starred in the episode "There's No Place Like Mode" of the comedy series Ugly Betty.

Beginning in September 2010, Stuhlbarg portrayed organized crime boss Arnold Rothstein in Terence Winter's HBO crime drama series Boardwalk Empire. The character was written off after the show's fourth season in 2013. Martin Scorsese directed the pilot episode of the show, after having previously directed Stuhlbarg in the short film The Key to Reserva (2007). In Scorsese's historical adventure film Hugo (2011), Stuhlbarg played René Tabard, a film historian. Stuhlbarg appeared in the science fiction comedy sequel Men in Black 3 (2012) as Griffin, an alien with clairvoyant abilities who helps Agent J (played by Will Smith) and K (played by Tommy Lee Jones and Josh Brolin) on their mission. The film's director, Barry Sonnenfeld, said that after seeing Stuhlbarg's script and notebook filled with "tiny scribbles, notes, diagrams" that “It made me suspect that perhaps I had actually cast an alien. To Michael, all his little notations made sense. To me, they were scary and indecipherable.” Later in the year, Stuhlbarg briefly appeared as a hitman alongside his Boardwalk Empire co-star Michael Pitt in the opening scene of Martin McDonagh's dark comedy Seven Psychopaths. His third release of 2012 was the historical drama Lincoln, directed by Steven Spielberg and starring Daniel Day-Lewis as President Abraham Lincoln. In the film, he portrayed Democratic Congressman George Yeaman, representative of Kentucky. The Alfred Hitchcock biopic Hitchcock was his final release of the year, with Stuhlbarg portraying talent agent and studio executive Lew Wasserman. In Woody Allen's comedy-drama Blue Jasmine (2013), starring Cate Blanchett, Stuhlbarg appeared as a dentist who makes unwanted sexual advances to Blanchett's character.

=== 2014–present ===
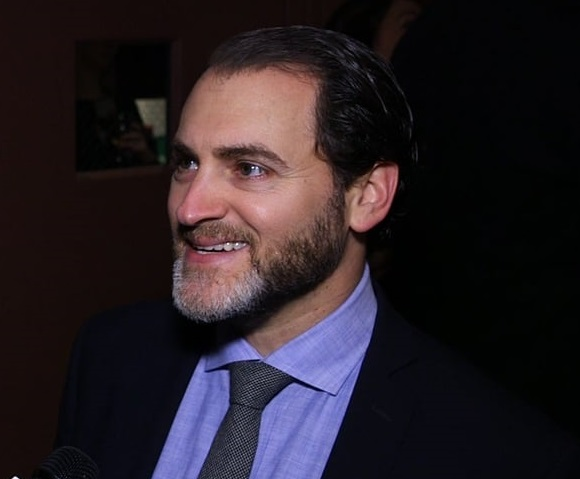
Stuhlbarg at the 30th Artios Awards in 2016

Stuhlbarg played chess grandmaster Bobby Fischer's attorney, Paul Marshall, in the 2014 film Pawn Sacrifice, starring Tobey Maguire as Fischer. In Danny Boyle's 2015 Steve Jobs biopic, Stuhlbarg portrayed computer scientist Andy Hertzfeld, who was a member of the original Mac team. He appeared in two more biographical films in that year – Trumbo, based on the life of screenwriter Dalton Trumbo (played by Bryan Cranston), featured Stuhlbarg portraying actor Edward G. Robinson, who was accused of having ties to the Communist Party during the Hollywood blacklist, and Stuhlbarg played a supporting role in Don Cheadle's Miles Ahead, based on the life of Miles Davis. Stuhlbarg played a CIA agent in the science fiction drama Arrival (2016), appearing alongside Amy Adams, Jeremy Renner, and Forest Whitaker as they attempt to translate communications from an extraterrestrial craft. In the same month, Stuhlbarg played Nicodemus West, colleague and rival to the titular character (played by Benedict Cumberbatch) in the superhero film Doctor Strange. In his final release of the year, the political thriller Miss Sloane, Stuhlbarg featured as an Irish lobbying firm head battling against gun control. Brian Truitt of USA Today praised his "superb" performance and declared him "One of the best in Hollywood right now".

In the third season of the crime anthology television series Fargo, Stuhlbarg played Sy Feltz, loyal and dedicated business partner to Ewan McGregor's character Emmit Stussy. The season premiered in April 2017. In November, Stuhlbarg co-starred as Samuel Perlman, an archaeology professor, whose son Elio (played by Timothée Chalamet) develops a relationship with his father's assistant (played by Armie Hammer), in the romantic drama Call Me by Your Name. Stuhlbarg was moved by Perlman's "sense of generosity and love and understanding" and director Luca Guadagnino said he cast Stuhlbarg because he wanted "someone who could carry a sort of softness and warmth and at the same time communicate a great knowledge and great culture". Perlman's consoling speech given to his son in the film was described by Huffington Post writer Nell Minow as being "one of the most moving scenes ever filmed." For Guillermo del Toro's fantasy drama The Shape of Water, released in December 2017 to critical and box office success, Stuhlbarg was required to speak Russian to play Dr. Robert Hoffstetler, a Soviet spy. His final performance of 2017 and second release of December, was as The New York Times executive editor A. M. Rosenthal, in Steven Spielberg's political thriller The Post, which starred Tom Hanks and Meryl Streep and depicts the publishing of the Pentagon Papers by journalists from The Washington Post and The Times. With his performances in Call Me By Your Name, The Shape of Water, and The Post, he became the sixth actor to appear in three films nominated for the Academy Award for Best Picture in the same year.

Stuhlbarg was due to appear as Gore Vidal's domestic partner Howard Austen in the biopic Gore, starring Kevin Spacey as Vidal, but the film was withdrawn from release during post-production amid ongoing sexual misconduct allegations against Spacey. He appeared in the 2018 miniseries The Looming Tower as counter-terrorism czar Richard A. Clarke, for which he received a Primetime Emmy Award nomination. He received a second Primetime Emmy Award nomination for his role as Richard Sackler in the 2021 miniseries Dopesick. In the television series Your Honor (2020–2023), Stuhlbarg played Jimmy Baxter, the mob boss of a prominent organized crime family in the city of New Orleans. In 2024, Stuhlbarg returned to Broadway portraying Boris Berezovsky in the transfer of Peter Morgan's play Patriots at the Ethel Barrymore Theatre. In the American espionage thriller The Amateur, he played a Russian arms dealer archvillain.

== Personal life ==
Stuhlbarg married Mai-Linh Lofgren in 2013. They have no children.

On March 31, 2024, Stuhlbarg was attacked in Central Park, New York City. As he was walking, a man threw a rock at him. It hit Stuhlbarg in the back of his neck. The man was arrested and charged with assault.

== Acting credits ==
Key
†	Denotes works that have not yet been released

=== Film ===
Year	Title	Role	Director	Notes
1998	A Price Above Rubies	Young Hassid	Boaz Yakin	
2001	The Grey Zone	Cohen	Tim Blake Nelson	
2008	Afterschool	Mr. Burke	Antonio Campos	
2008	Body of Lies	Ferris' Attorney	Ridley Scott	
2009	Cold Souls	Hedge Fund Consultant	Sophie Barthes	
2009	A Serious Man	Larry Gopnik	Coen Brothers	
2011	Hugo	Prof. René Tabard	Martin Scorsese	
2012	Men in Black 3	Griffin	Barry Sonnenfeld	
2012	Seven Psychopaths	Tommy	Martin McDonagh	
2012	Lincoln	George Yeaman	Steven Spielberg	
2012	Hitchcock	Lew Wasserman	Sacha Gervasi	
2013	Blue Jasmine	Dr. Flicker	Woody Allen	
2014	Cut Bank	Derby Milton	Matt Shakman	
2014	Pawn Sacrifice	Paul Marshall	Edward Zwick	
2015	Steve Jobs	Andy Hertzfeld	Danny Boyle	
2015	Trumbo	Edward G. Robinson	Jay Roach	
2015	Miles Ahead	Harper Hamilton	Don Cheadle	
2016	Arrival	Agent Halpern	Denis Villeneuve	
2016	Doctor Strange	Nicodemus West	Scott Derrickson	
2016	Miss Sloane	Pat Connors	John Madden	
2017	Gore	Howard Austen	Michael Hoffman	Unreleased
2017	Call Me by Your Name	Prof. Samuel Perlman	Luca Guadagnino	
2017	The Shape of Water	Dr. Robert Hoffstetler/Dimitri Mosenkov	Guillermo del Toro	
2017	The Post	Abe Rosenthal	Steven Spielberg	
2020	Shirley	Stanley Edgar Hyman	Josephine Decker	
2020	Salvatore: Shoemaker of Dreams	Narrator (voice)	Luca Guadagnino	Documentary
2021	Beckett	Robert "Bob" Hanson	Ferdinando Cito Filomarino	
2022	Doctor Strange in the Multiverse of Madness	Nicodemus West	Sam Raimi	
2022	Bones and All	Jake	Luca Guadagnino	
2024	The Instigators	Mr. Besegai	Doug Liman	
2025	The Amateur	Horst Schiller	James Hawes	
2025	After the Hunt	Frederik Olsson	Luca Guadagnino	
2026	Digger	Eddie, the Vice President	Alejandro González Iñárritu	

=== Television ===
Year	Title	Role	Notes
1999	The Hunley	Wicks	Television film
2006	Law & Order: Criminal Intent	Marcel Costas	1 episode
2006–2007	Studio 60 on the Sunset Strip	Jerry	2 episodes
2006–2010	The American Experience	Various Characters	4 episodes
2007	Damages	Dr. Bernard Herschenfeld	1 episode
2008	Law & Order	Timothy Pace	1 episode
2009	Ugly Betty	Heinrich	1 episode
2010–2013	Boardwalk Empire	Arnold Rothstein	Main role, 32 episodes
2015–2016	Transparent	Chaim	2 episodes
2017	Fargo	Sy Feltz	Recurring role, 8 episodes
2018	The Looming Tower	Richard Clarke	Miniseries, 8 episodes
2019	Traitors	Rowe	Miniseries, 5 episodes
2020–2023	Your Honor	Jimmy Baxter	Main role, 20 episodes
2021	Dopesick	Richard Sackler	Miniseries, 8 episodes
2022	The Staircase	David Rudolf	Miniseries, 8 episodes

=== Theater ===
Year	Title	Role	Notes
1992	Woyzeck	Barker / Soldier / Apprentice	The Public Theatre, off-Broadway
1993	All's Well That Ends Well	Gentleman	Delacorte Theatre, off-Broadway
1993	Saint Joan	Dauphin, Charles VII	Lyceum Theatre, Broadway
1993	Three Men on a Horse	Al / Radio Announcer	Lyceum Theatre, Broadway
1993	Timon of Athens	The Old Athenian / Bandit	Lyceum Theatre, Broadway
1993–1994	The Government Inspector	Ivan Shpekin	Lyceum Theatre, Broadway
1994	Richard II	King Richard II	Anspacher Theater, off-Broadway
1995	Old Wicked Songs	Stephen Hoffman	Playhouse 91, off-Broadway
1996	The Grey Zone	Hoffman	MCC Theater, off-Broadway
1996	Taking Sides	Lieutenant David Wills	Brooks Atkinson Theatre, Broadway
1997	Henry VIII	Surveyor for Buckingham / Cranmer / Archbishop of Canterbury	Delacorte Theatre, off-Broadway
1997	The Dybbuk	Khonen	The Public Theatre, off-Broadway
1999	Cabaret	Ernst Ludwig	Studio 54, Broadway
2000	The Winter's Tale	Time / Clown	Delacorte Theatre, off-Broadway
2001	The Invention of Love	Alfred W. Pollard	Lyceum Theatre, Broadway
2002	Cymbeline	Posthumus Leonatus	Lucille Lortel Theatre, off-Broadway
2002	Twelfth Night	Sir Andrew Aguecheek	Delacorte Theatre, off-Broadway
2003	The Persians	Xerxes I	National Actors Theatre, off-Broadway
2004	The Mysteries	Jesus/Issac/Lucifer	CSC Theatre, off-Broadway
2004–2005	Belle Epoque	Francois	Mitzi E. Newhouse Theatre, off-Broadway
2005	The Pillowman	Michal	Booth Theatre, Broadway
2006	Measure for Pleasure	Will Blunt	Anspacher Theatre, off-Broadway
2006	The Voysey Inheritance	Edward Voysey	Linda Gross Theatre, off-Broadway
2008	Hamlet	Hamlet	Delacorte Theatre, off-Broadway
2019	Socrates	Socrates	The Public Theater, off-Broadway
2024	Patriots	Boris Berezovsky	Ethel Barrymore Theatre, Broadway
