= Camp Siegfried (play) =

2021 play by Bess Wohl

- 2022 Off-Broadway production poster
- Original language: English
- Written by: Bess Wohl
- Characters: Him, Her
- Genre: Drama

Premiere
- Date: September 7, 2021
- Place: The Old Vic

Camp Siegfried is a play by Bess Wohl. Its setting is the real Camp Siegfried where American children of German descent were taught Nazi ideology.

== Plot ==
The play follows two American teenagers in 1938 attending a German-American summer camp, Camp Siegfried in Yaphank, New York ahead of World War II, where they're taught Nazi ideology. The two, separated by gender at camp, fall in love. The play is inspired by the real-life camp in the United States during this era, dealing with themes of anti-semitism and fascism.

== Background ==
Playwright Wohl had rented a house in Bellport, Long Island, and had researched the nearby town of Yaphank. She discovered the town had hosted a camp for German-American youth, and felt it had the makings of a drama.

== Productions ==
Camp Siegfried premiered at The Old Vic theatre in London, in a production starring Patsy Ferran as Her and Luke Thallon as Him. The production played a limited run from 7 September 2021 to 30 October.

A production opened off-Broadway at the Tony Kiser Theatre on 15 November 2022 and ran through 4 December 2022, following previews from 25 October. The cast featured Johnny Berchtold (originally cast to Sawyer Barth) as Him and Lily McInerny as Her. The production was directed by David Cromer.

== Critical reception ==
In his 5 star review for The Independent, Paul Taylor described Camp Siegfried as "an insightful piece about the frightening appeal of fascism". In her 3 star review for The Guardian, Arifa Akbar states that "while Wohl’s dialogue is good at teen neurosis, it contains an offputtingly self-conscious tone, carefully crafted for cuteness".

== Awards and nominations ==
=== 2021 West End production ===
Year	Award	Category	Nominee	Result	Ref.
2022	Evening Standard Theatre Awards	Promising Playwright	Bess Wohl	Nominated	
2022	BroadwayWorld UK Awards	Best Leading Performer in a New Production of a Play	Patsy Ferran	Nominated	
2022	WhatsOnStage Awards	Best Performer In A Female Identifying Role In A Play	Patsy Ferran	Nominated	

== See also ==
- Camp Siegfried
