= List of actors in Royal Shakespeare Company productions =

The following is a list of notable actors who have appeared in Royal Shakespeare Company productions and at Stratford.

== A ==
- F. Murray Abraham
- Joss Ackland
- Dallas Adams
- Freema Agyeman
- Roger Allam
- Sheila Allen
- Miles Anderson
- Harry Andrews
- Francesca Annis
- Richard Armitage
- Alun Armstrong
- Peggy Ashcroft
- Eileen Atkins
- Hayley Atwell
- James Aubrey

== B ==
- Angela Baddeley
- Annette Badland
- David Bailie
- Ian Bannen
- Frances Barber
- Alan Bates
- Mathew Baynton
- Simon Russell Beale
- Sean Bean
- Nicholas Bell
- Claire Benedict
- Paul Bettany
- Christopher Biggins
- Colin Blakely
- Brian Blessed
- Samantha Bond
- David Bradley
- Kenneth Branagh
- Jasper Britton
- Brenda Bruce
- Richard Burton
- Antony Byrne

== C ==
- Simon Callow
- Cheryl Campbell
- Denis Carey
- Nancy Carroll
- Bertie Carvel
- James Chalmers
- Ian Charleson
- Tony Church
- David Collings
- Shelley Conn
- Ron Cook
- Judy Cornwell
- Oliver Cotton
- Brian Cox
- Ben Cross
- Julian Curry
- Tim Curry
- Cyril Cusack
- Niamh Cusack
- Sinéad Cusack
- Henry Ian Cusick

== D ==
- Joshua Dallas
- Timothy Dalton
- Charles Dance
- Phil Daniels
- Oliver Ford Davies
- Daniel Day-Lewis
- Judi Dench
- Les Dennis
- Paola Dionisotti
- Jill Dixon
- Pip Donaghy
- Simon Dormandy
- Roy Dotrice
- Angela Down
- Penny Downie
- Amanda Drew
- Lindsay Duncan

== E ==
- Christopher Eccleston
- Peter Egan
- Tamsin Egerton
- Jennifer Ehle
- Robin Ellis
- Edith Evans
- Rupert Evans

== F ==
- Nicholas Farrell
- Ada Ferrar
- Mia Farrow
- Emma Fielding
- Joseph Fiennes
- Ralph Fiennes
- Susan Fleetwood
- Dexter Fletcher
- James Frain
- Rosemary Frankau
- Philip Franks
- Bill Fraser

== G ==
- Ryan Gage
- Mariah Gale
- Michael Gambon
- Romola Garai
- Mark Gatiss
- William Gaunt
- Colin George
- John Gielgud
- Alexandra Gilbreath
- Iain Glen
- Robert Glenister
- Julian Glover
- Patrick Godfrey
- Michelle Gomez
- Stella Gonet
- Michael Goodliffe
- Henry Goodman
- Marius Goring
- Nickolas Grace
- Tamsin Greig
- Richard Griffiths
- Jane Gurnett
- Mike Gwilym

== H ==
- David Haig
- Victoria Hamilton
- Robert Hardy
- Davyd Harries
- Jared Harris
- Lisa Harrow
- Andrew Havill
- Nigel Hawthorne
- John Heffernan
- Don Henderson
- Janet Henfrey
- Guy Henry
- Sam Heughan
- Greg Hicks
- Clare Higgins
- Ciarán Hinds
- Ian Holm
- Michael Hordern
- Jane Horrocks
- Rufus Hound
- Will Houston
- Alan Howard
- Arthur Hughes
- Nerys Hughes
- Gareth Hunt
- Kelly Hunter
- Colin Hurley
- Christopher Hurst
- Geoffrey Hutchings
- Jonathan Hyde

== I ==
- Barrie Ingham
- Jeremy Irons

== J ==
- Glenda Jackson
- Derek Jacobi
- Emrys James
- Neville Jason
- Tony Jay
- Michael Jayston
- Barbara Jefford
- Alex Jennings
- Paul Jesson
- Richard Johnson
- Griffith Jones
- Nicholas Jones
- Paterson Joseph

== K ==
- Alexis Kanner
- Charles Kay
- Charles Keating
- Geoffrey Keen
- Katherine Kelly
- Polly Kemp
- Janet Key
- Ben Kingsley
- Alex Kingston
- Kadiff Kirwan
- Michael Kitchen
- Alice Krige

== L ==
- Peter Land
- Jane Lapotaire
- Jude Law
- Josie Lawrence
- Vivien Leigh
- Barbara Leigh-Hunt
- Anton Lesser
- Elliot Levey
- Damian Lewis
- Maureen Lipman
- Robert Lindsay
- John Lithgow
- Robert Longden
- Adrian Lukis
- Cherie Lunghi
- Patti LuPone

== M ==
- Matthew Macfadyen
- Art Malik
- Lesley Manville
- Joseph Marcell
- Roger Martin
- Daniel Massey
- Forbes Masson
- Richard McCabe
- Alec McCowen
- Sylvester McCoy
- Ian McDiarmid
- Malcolm McDowell
- Peter McEnery
- Geraldine McEwan
- Alistair McGowan
- Lloyd McGuire
- Ian McKellen
- Leo McKern
- Don McKillop
- Janet McTeer
- Joe Melia
- Vivien Merchant
- Peter Messaline
- Helen Mirren
- Alfred Molina
- Richard Moore
- Julian Morris
- David Morrissey
- Carey Mulligan
- Brian Murray
- Eve Myles

== N ==
- John Nettles
- Jeremy Northam

== O ==
- Gary Oldman
- Laurence Olivier
- Peter O'Toole
- David Oyelowo

== P ==
- Richard Pasco
- Trevor Peacock
- Bob Peck
- Michael Pennington
- Edward Petherbridge
- Siân Phillips
- Ronald Pickup
- Tim Pigott-Smith
- Christopher Plummer
- Eric Porter
- Pete Postlethwaite
- Mike Pratt
- Jonathan Pryce
- James Purefoy

== Q ==
- Hugh Quarshie
- Anthony Quayle
- Caroline Quentin
- Diana Quick
- Denis Quilley

== R ==
- Michael Redgrave
- Vanessa Redgrave
- Siobhan Redmond
- Roger Rees
- Vincent Regan
- Emily Richard
- Ian Richardson
- Joely Richardson
- Miles Richardson
- Ralph Richardson
- Alan Rickman
- Diana Rigg
- David Rintoul
- Mawaan Rizwan
- Linus Roache
- Norman Rodway
- Paul Rogers
- Amanda Root
- Clifford Rose
- Mark Rylance

== S ==
- Paul Scofield
- Nicholas Selby
- Fiona Shaw
- Sebastian Shaw
- Michael Sheen
- W. Morgan Sheppard
- Antony Sher
- John Shrapnel
- Michael Siberry
- Josette Simon
- Donald Sinden
- Jonathan Slinger
- Georgia Slowe
- Timothy Spall
- Walter Sparrow
- Elizabeth Spriggs
- Barry Stanton
- Robert Stephens
- Toby Stephens
- David Sterne
- Juliet Stevenson
- Patrick Stewart
- Mark Strong
- Imogen Stubbs
- David Suchet
- Janet Suzman
- Clive Swift
- Tilda Swinton

== T ==
- Catherine Tate
- André Tchaikowsky
- David Tennant
- Nigel Terry
- John Thaw
- Luke Thallon
- Gareth Thomas
- Sophie Thompson
- David Threlfall
- Frances de la Tour
- David Troughton
- Dorothy Tutin
- Cathy Tyson
- Margaret Tyzack

== U ==
- Mary Ure

== V ==
- Philip Voss

== W ==
- Harriet Walter
- Zoë Wanamaker
- Derek Waring
- David Warner
- Dennis Waterman
- Gwen Watford
- Emily Watson
- Ruby Wax
- Samuel West
- Timothy West
- Lia Williams
- Michael Williams
- Nicol Williamson
- Penelope Wilton
- Clive Wood
- John Wood
- Peter Woodthorpe
- John Woodvine
- Peter Woodward
- Irene Worth
- Leo Wringer

== Y ==
- Arnold Yarrow
- Susannah York

== Z ==
- Assad Zaman
