= 63rd Evening Standard Theatre Awards =

- Date: 3 December 2017
- Location: Theatre Royal, Drury Lane
- Hosted by: Phoebe Waller-Bridge

Highlights
- Most wins: The Ferryman (3)
- Most nominations: The Ferryman (4)

The 63rd Evening Standard Theatre Awards were awarded in recognition of the 2016–17 London Theatre season on 3 December 2017 at the Theatre Royal, Drury Lane. The shortlist for the Radio 2 Audience Award for Best Musical was announced in October 2017, and the full list of nominees was announced in November 2017. The ceremony was presented by Phoebe Waller-Bridge and co-hosted by Cate Blanchett, Evgeny Lebedev, Lin-Manuel Miranda and Anna Wintour.

== Eligibility and nominators ==
The advisory judging panel consisted of Daily Mail columnist Baz Bamigboye, WhatsOnStage theatre critic Sarah Crompton, Evening Standard chief theatre critic Henry Hitchings, The Guardian culture writer and broadcaster Mark Lawson, The New York Times International theatre critic Matt Wolf and Evening Standard editor George Osborne.

== Ceremony ==
=== Presenters ===
- Cate Blanchett presented the Natasha Richardson Award for Best Actress
- Sarah Burton presented Best Design
- Jez Butterworth presented the Charles Wintour Award for Most Promising Playwright
- Jeremy Irvine and Allison Williams presented the Radio 2 Audience Award for Best Musical
- Cush Jumbo presented the Emerging Talent Award
- Helen McCrory presented Best Director
- Lin-Manuel Miranda presented Best Play
- Ruth Negga presented Best Actor
- Zendaya presented Best Musical Performance

=== Performances ===
- Arinzé Kene performed "A Change Is Gonna Come"
- The cast of Everybody's Talking About Jamie performed

=== Sponsors ===
The ceremony was held in association with Qatar Airways and the 'Platinum Partner' was Michael Kors.

The following awards were presented in partnership:

- Best Play was awarded in partnership with Hiscox, the official Evening Standard arts partner
- Best Actor was awarded in partnership with the Ambassador Theatre Group
- The Natasha Richardson Award for Best Actress was awarded in partnership with Christian Louboutin

The Really Useful Theatres Group were also event partners.

== Winners and nominees ==
Best Play	Radio 2 Audience Award for Best Musical
The Ferryman by Jez Butterworth, Gielgud Theatre and Royal Court Theatre; The Children by Lucy Kirkwood, Royal Court Theatre; Ink by James Graham, Almeida Theatre and Duke of York’s Theatre; Oslo by J. T. Rogers, Harold Pinter Theatre and National Theatre Lyttelton	Bat Out of Hell: The Musical, London Coliseum; An American in Paris, Dominion Theatre; Dreamgirls, Savoy Theatre; Follies, National Theatre Olivier; School of Rock, New London Theatre; The Secret Diary of Adrian Mole Aged 13 ¾, Menier Chocolate Factory; She Loves Me, Menier Chocolate Factory
Best Actor	Natasha Richardson Award for Best Actress
Andrew Garfield, Angels in America, National Theatre Lyttelton; Bertie Carvel, Ink, Almeida Theatre and Duke of York’s Theatre; Andrew Scott, Hamlet, Almeida Theatre and Harold Pinter Theatre	Glenda Jackson, King Lear, Old Vic; Laura Donnelly, The Ferryman, Gielgud Theatre and Royal Court Theatre; Victoria Hamilton, Albion, Almeida Theatre
Best Musical Performance	Milton Shulman Award for Best Director
Amber Riley, Dreamgirls, Savoy Theatre; Janie Dee, Follies, National Theatre Olivier; Robert Fairchild, An American in Paris, Dominion Theatre	Sam Mendes, The Ferryman, Gielgud Theatre and Royal Court Theatre; Dominic Cooke, Follies, National Theatre Olivier; Robert Icke, Hamlet, Almeida Theatre and Harold Pinter Theatre
Best Design	Charles Wintour Award for Most Promising Playwright
Bunny Christie, Heisenberg: The Uncertainty Principle (Wyndham’s Theatre), The Red Barn (National Theatre Lyttelton) and Ink (Duke of York’s Theatre and Almeida Theatre); Jon Bausor, Bat Out of Hell: The Musical, London Coliseum; Soutra Gilmour, Twelfth Night, National Theatre Olivier	Branden Jacobs-Jenkins, An Octoroon, Orange Tree Theatre; Al Smith, Harrogate, High Tide Festival and Royal Court Theatre; Katherine Soper, Wish List, Royal Court Theatre and Royal Exchange Manchester
Emerging Talent Award
Tom Glynn-Carney, The Ferryman, Gielgud Theatre and Royal Court Theatre; Sheila Atim, Girl from the North Country, Old Vic; Luke Thallon, Albion, Almeida Theatre

=== Multiple awards ===
3 awards

- The Ferryman

=== Multiple nominations ===
4 nominations

- The Ferryman

3 nominations

- Follies
- Ink

2 nominations

- Albion
- An American in Paris
- Bat Out of Hell: The Musical
- Dreamgirls
- Hamlet

== See also ==
- 2016 Laurence Olivier Awards
- 2017 Laurence Olivier Awards
