= Luke Thallon =

English actor (born 1996)

- Born: 14 April 1996 (age 30); West Byfleet, Surrey, England
- Education: Guildhall School of Music and Drama (BA)
- Occupation: Actor
- Years active: 2017–present

Luke Thallon (born 14 April 1996) is an English actor.

== Early life and education ==
Thallon was born in West Byfleet, Surrey. He is of Polish descent through his father and German and Irish descent through his mother. His parents were both professional volleyball players. Before becoming an actor, he originally wanted to be a dentist.

He graduated from the Guildhall School of Music and Drama in 2017.

== Career ==
In 2017, he was nominated for the Emerging Talent Award at the Evening Standard Theatre Awards for his performance in Mike Bartlett's Albion. In 2021, he won the Clarence Derwent Award for his performance in Tom Stoppard's Leopoldstadt. Later that year, he starred in Bess Wohl's Camp Siegfried. In 2022, he was included on The Stage's list of 25 theatremakers of the future. He originated the role of Roman Abramovich in Peter Morgan's Off West End production of Patriots, which later transferred to the Noël Coward Theatre in the West End and the Ethel Barrymore Theatre on Broadway.

In 2025, he was cast as Quirinus Quirrell in Max's upcoming Harry Potter television series.

== Acting credits ==
=== Film ===
Year	Title	Role	Notes	Ref.
2018	The Favourite	Abigail's Soldier	Uncredited	

=== Television ===
Year	Title	Role	Notes	Ref.
2026-present	Harry Potter	Quirinus Quirrell		

=== Theatre ===
Year	Title	Role	Venue	Notes	Ref.
2018	Albion	Gabriel	Almeida Theatre		
2018	Misalliance	Joey	Orange Tree Theatre		
2018	The Inheritance	Young Walter	Young Vic	Off West End	
2018	Cock	John	Chichester Festival Theatre		
2018	The Room	Sands	Harold Pinter Theatre	West End	
2018	Family Voices	Voice One	Harold Pinter Theatre	West End	
2019	Present Laughter	Roland	The Old Vic		
2020	Leopoldstadt	Fritz/Leo	Wyndham's Theatre	West End	
2021	After Life	Two	Royal National Theatre		
2021	Camp Siegfried	Him	The Old Vic		
2023	Patriots	Roman Abramovich	Almeida Theatre		
2023	Patriots	Roman Abramovich	Noël Coward Theatre	West End	
2023	Cold War	Wiktor	Almeida Theatre		
2024	Patriots	Roman Abramovich	Ethel Barrymore Theatre	Broadway	
2025	Hamlet	Prince Hamlet	Royal Shakespeare Theatre		

== See also ==
- List of actors in Royal Shakespeare Company productions
