= Mhaïreth =

- Oasis
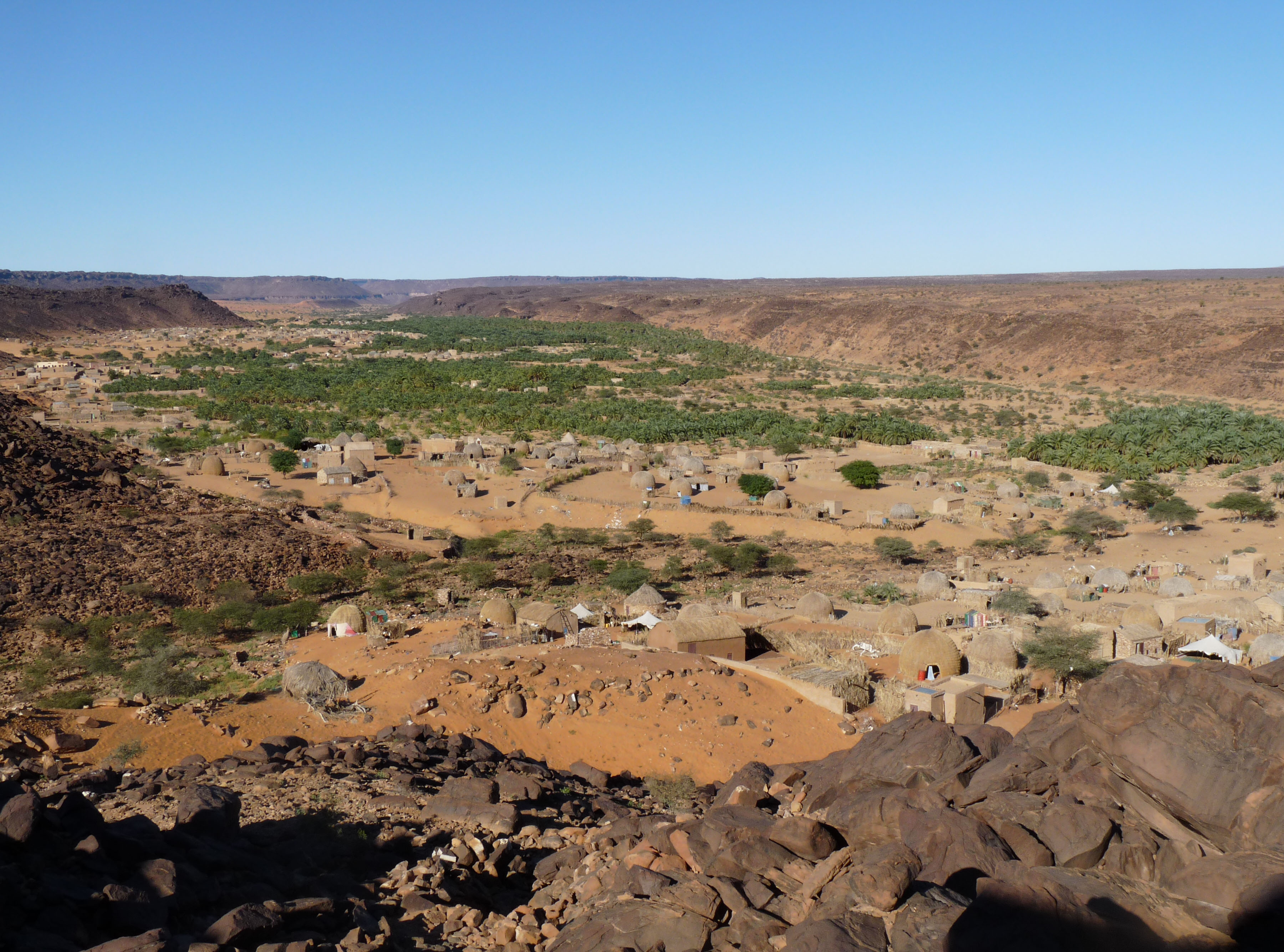
- Mhaïreth and its palm grove

- Location in Mauritania
- Coordinates: 20°15′50″N 13°0′20″W
- Country: Mauritania
- Region: Adrar Region
- Time zone: UTC±00:00 (GMT)

Mhaïreth or M'Heirth is one of the largest oases of the Adrar region in Mauritania. It is located near Terjit. Mhaïreth is part of the commune of Maaden in the Aoujeft Department.

== Galerie ==
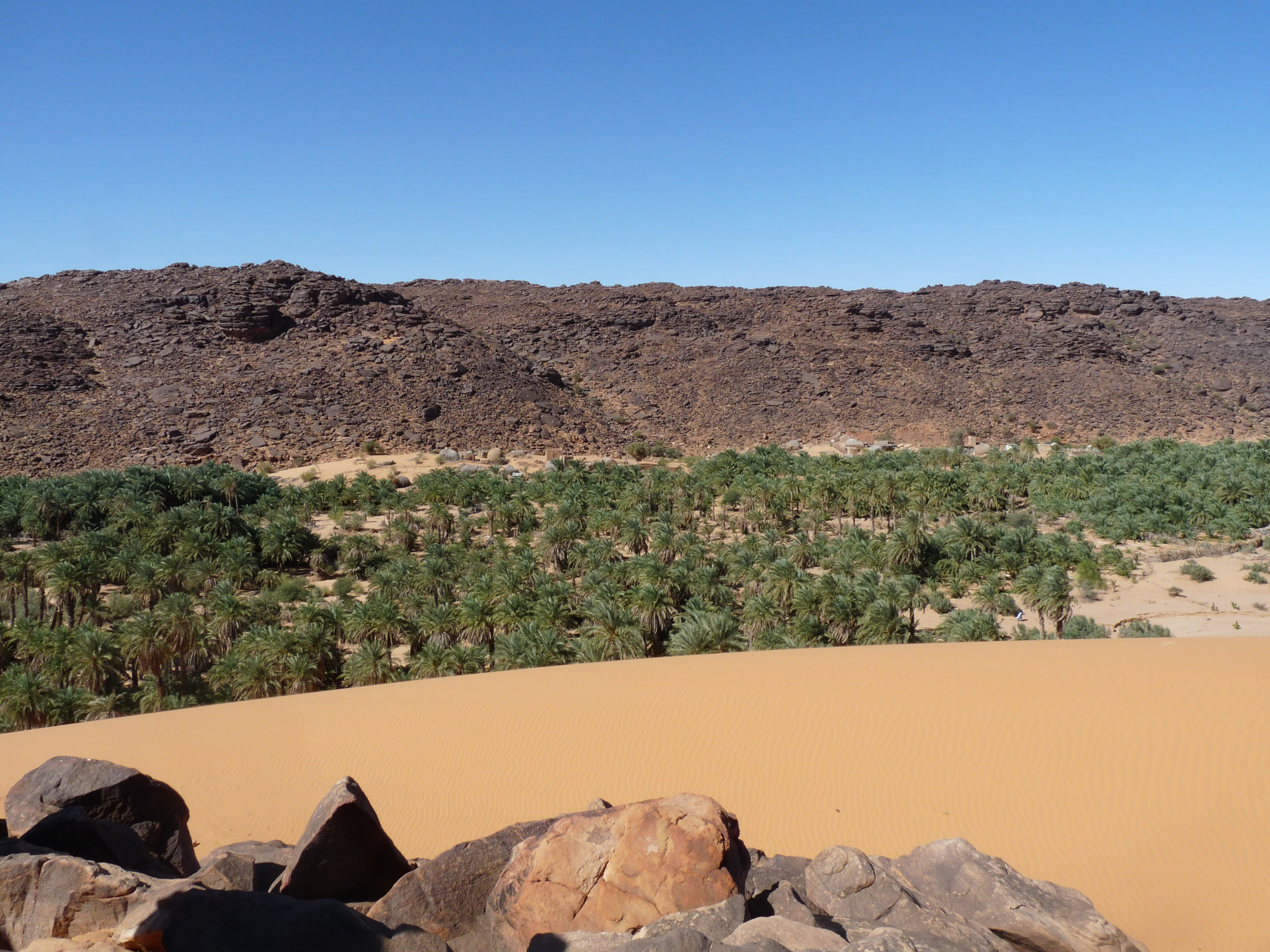
Palm grove between rocks and dunes

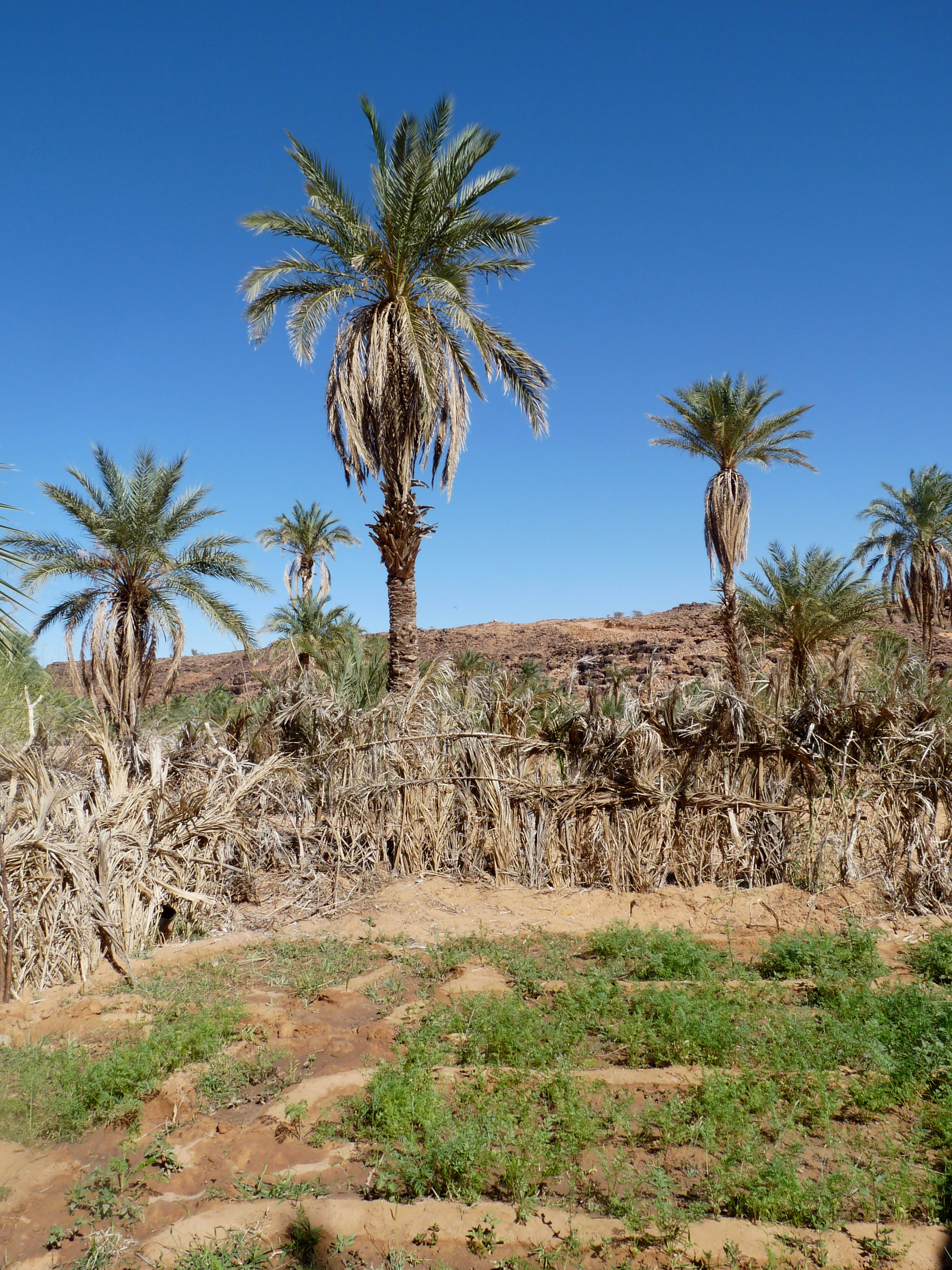
Food crops

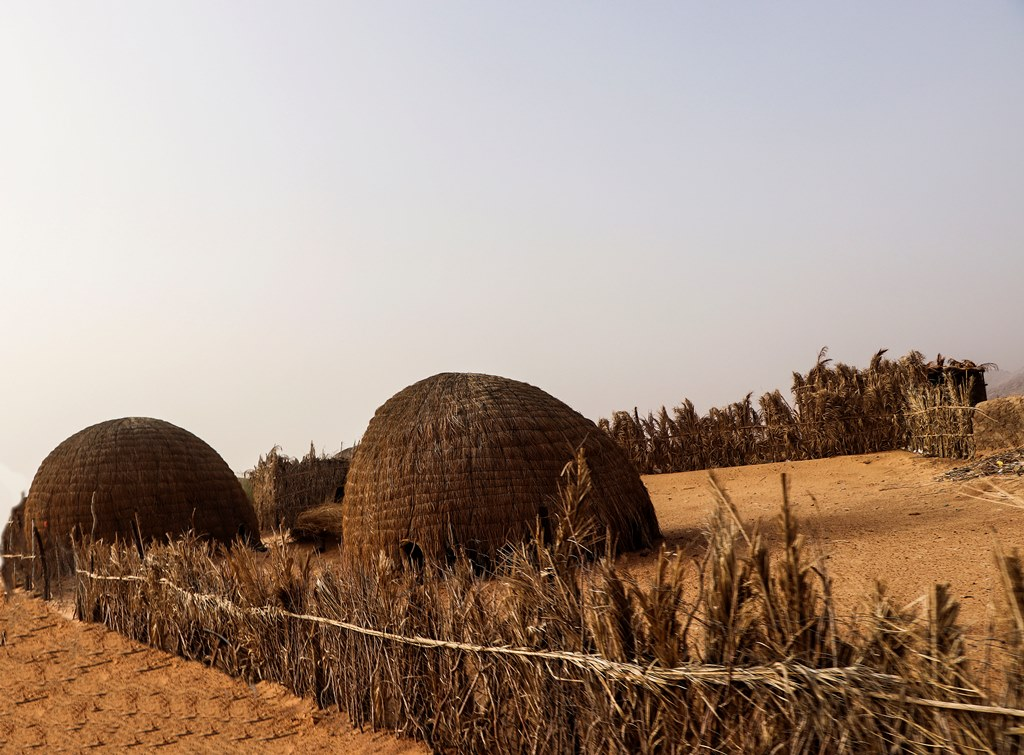
Two tikitts enclosed by a zariba

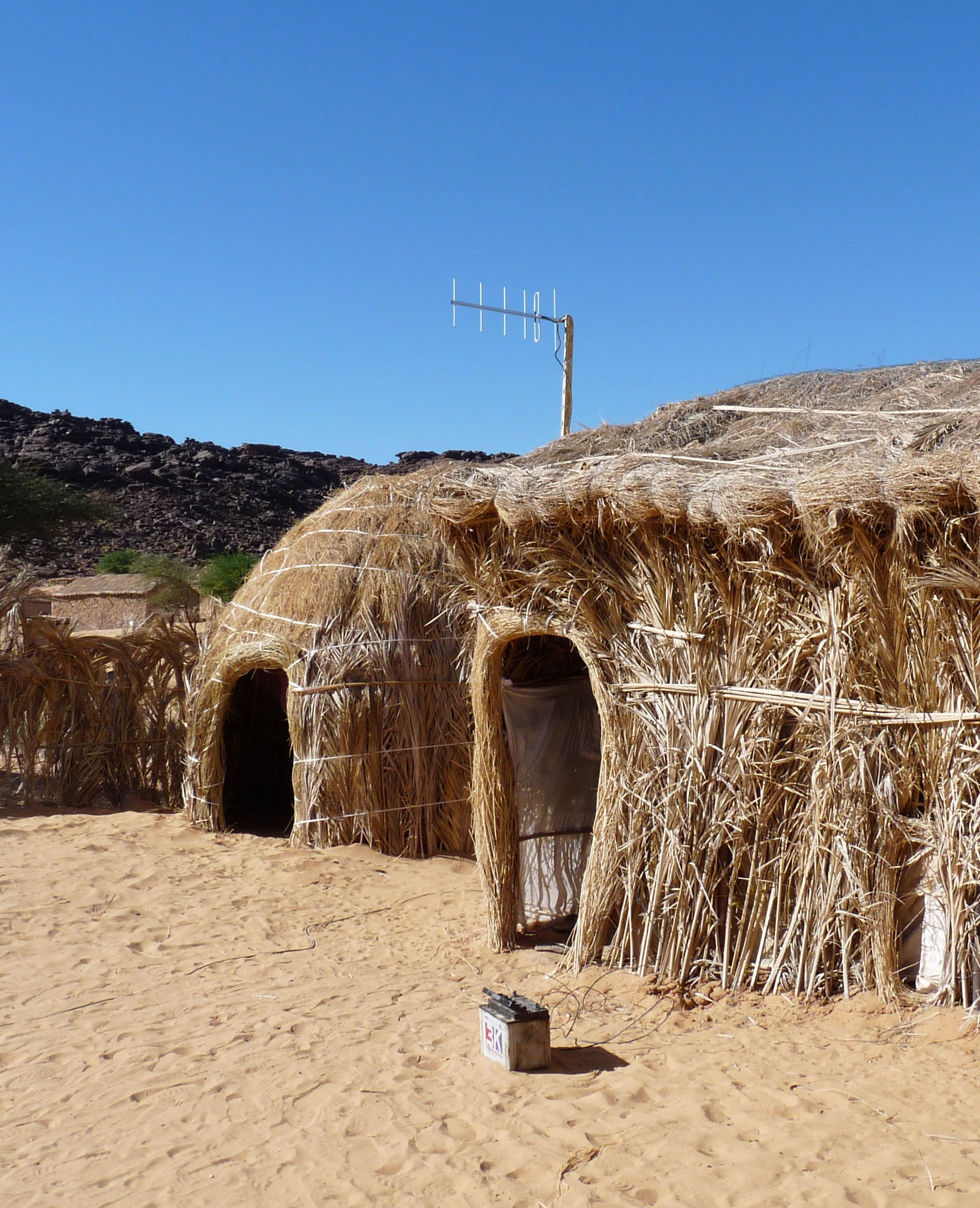
Tikitt with television antenna
