= Compound (enclosure) =

Enclosed cluster of associated buildings

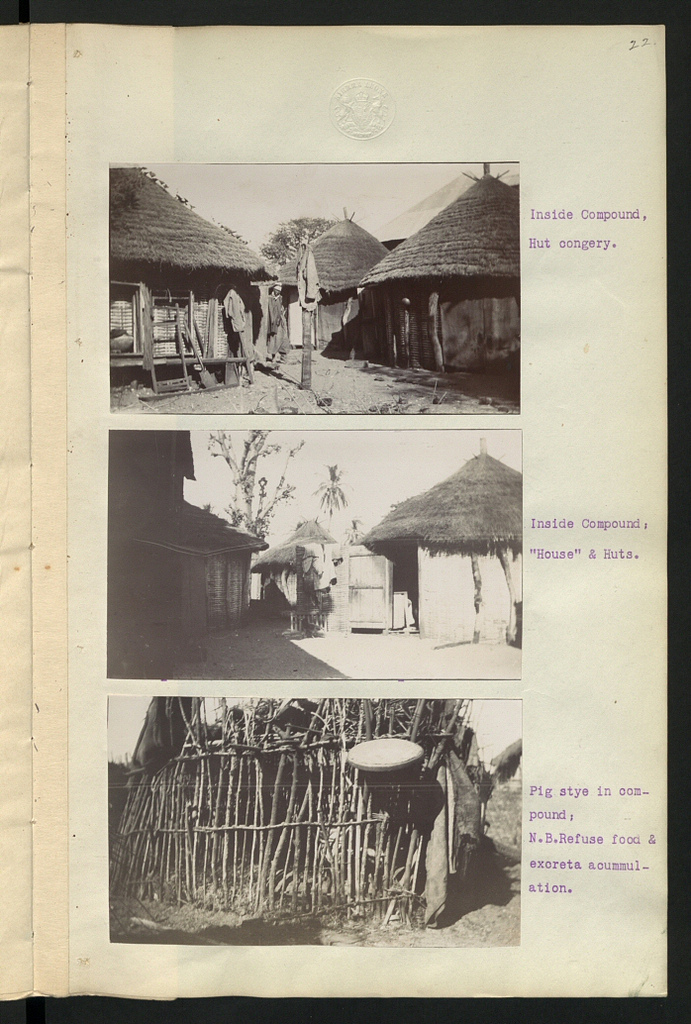
1) Inside compound, hut congery - Bathurst, Gambia - December 1910 2) Inside compound - House and huts - Bathurst, Gambia - December 1910 3) Pig sty in compound - Bathurst, Gambia - December 1910

Compound, when applied to a human habitat, refers to a cluster of buildings in an enclosure, having a shared or associated purpose, such as the houses of an extended family (e.g. the Kennedy Compound for the Kennedy family). The enclosure may be a wall, a fence, a hedge or some other structure, or it may be formed by the buildings themselves, when they are built around an open area or joined together.

According to the Oxford English Dictionary, the word compound in this sense is thought to be etymologically derived ultimately from the Malay-Indonesian word kampung or kampong, meaning 'enclosure' or 'village', probably entering English via Dutch or Portuguese.

In the United Kingdom, "compound" is used in "storage compound", but not otherwise generally used in the sense of an unfortified enclosure, and not for homes. There, as in North American English, if used for a place, it is most likely to be taken to mean a fortified military compound. The unfortified enclosure usage was developed by the British Empire in Asia and Africa. Now it has slightly different meanings among English-speaking people on those continents:

- In Asia, it refers to a collection of business establishments or living quarters, especially those used by Europeans.
- In Africa, it used to mean a collection of workers' houses, but is now used for any cluster of related or linked homes, especially residences for members of the same family or those working for the same employer, or those belonging to a farm, or the cluster of houses known in Africa as a homestead. The term can also be applied to an establishment such as a school or business, as in "the school compound" or "the factory compound". In the English dialects of some African countries, "compound" may refer to a much larger collection of dwellings, as a synonym for a homogeneous township or suburb comprising homes of similar character usually built as public housing projects, or for a shantytown. An example is Chawama Compound, Lusaka, Zambia.

== See also ==
- Compound (fortification)
- Boma (enclosure)
- Kraal
