= Camp Siegfried =

Nazi summer camp in New York

Coordinates: 40°50′42″N 72°56′29″W

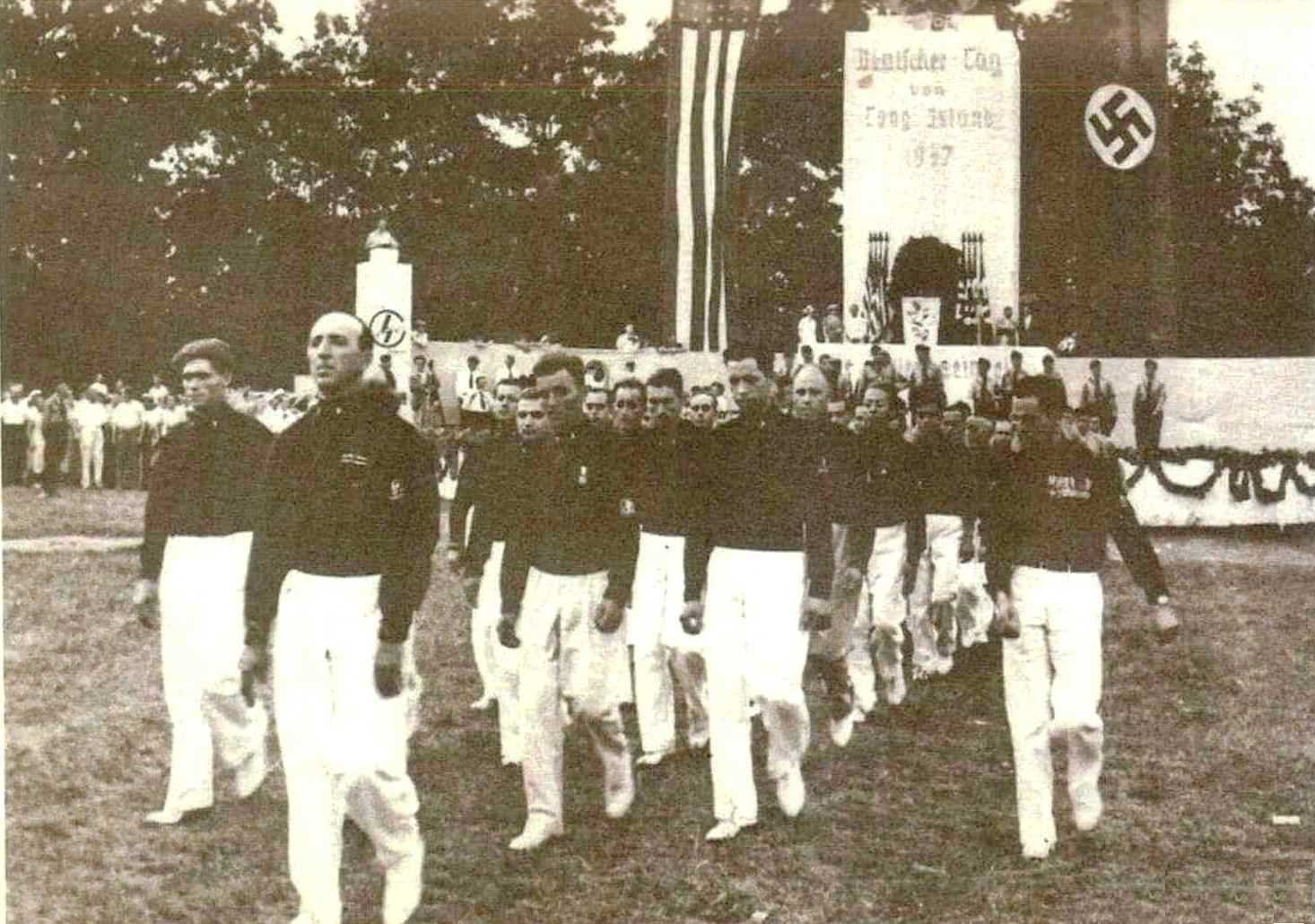
Blackshirts marching at Camp Siegfried, with an American flag banner and a Nazi swastika banner in the background

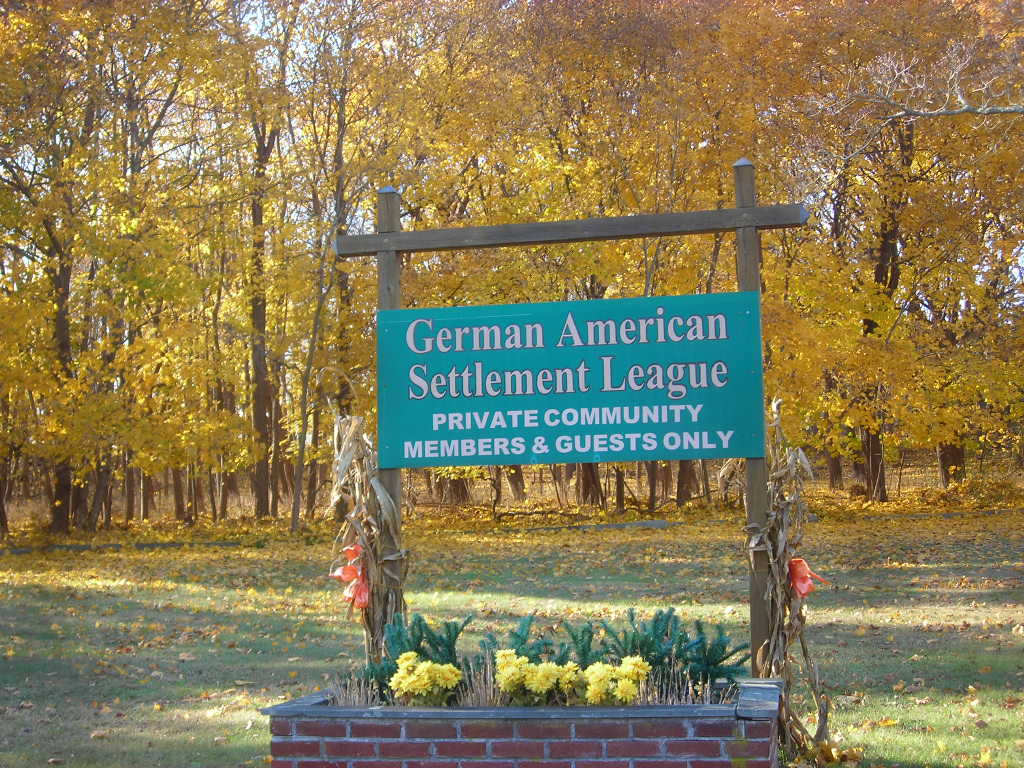
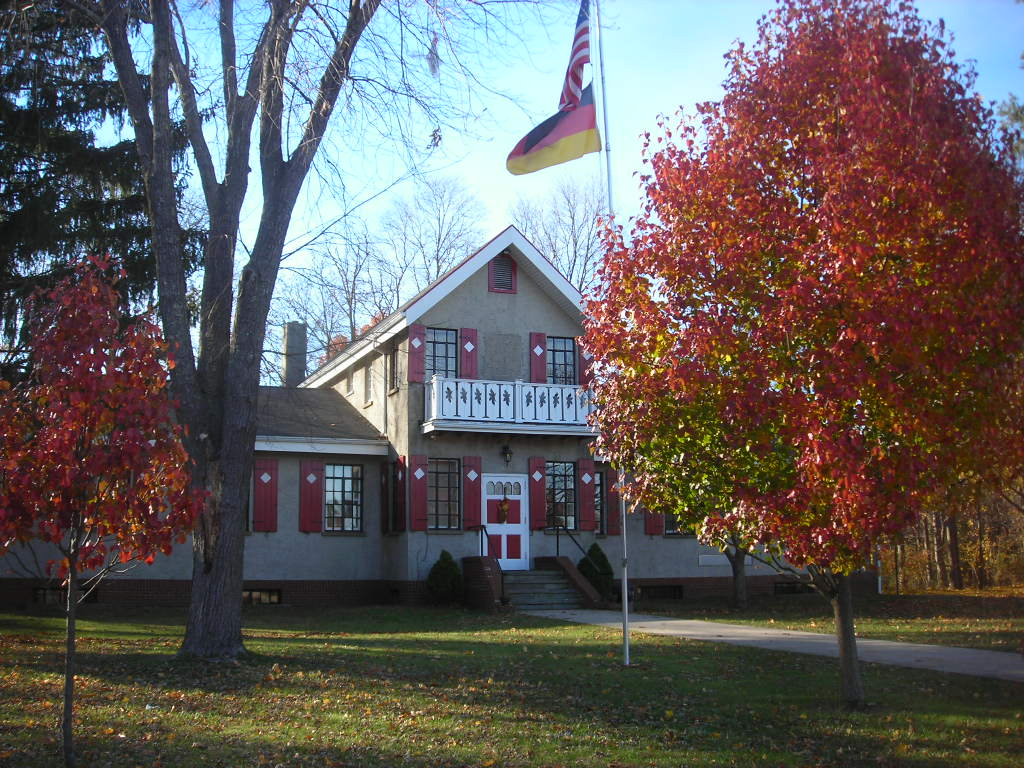
German American Settlement League community pre-lawsuit, 2007

Camp Siegfried was a summer camp which taught Nazi ideology that was located in Yaphank, New York, on Long Island. It was owned by the German American Bund, an American Nazi organization devoted to promoting a favorable view of Nazi Germany, and was operated by the German American Settlement League (GASL). Camp Siegfried was one of many such camps in the US in the 1930s, including Camp Hindenberg in Grafton, Wisconsin, Camp Nordland in Andover, New Jersey, Deutschhorst Country Club in Sellersville, Pennsylvania, and a camp in Windham, New York.

== Description and history ==
The age of children at the camp ranged from about 6 to 18. Camp Siegfried had a pool, archery competitions, hikes through the woods, a youth camp on the other side of Upper Lake, oom-pah bands and Oktoberfest celebrations; women in German peasant outfits greeted visitors at the gate. Weekend-morning Long Island Rail Road trains called "Camp Siegfried Specials" ran from Penn Station in New York City to Yaphank for the convenience of the camp's guests, many of whom came out from the German-American Manhattan neighborhood of Yorkville to spend time at what appeared to be a family-oriented summer retreat. In 1938, The New York Times reported that 40,000 people attended that year's annual German Day festivities.

But Camp Siegfried also had Nazi and Hitler Youth flags displayed on the grounds, along with pictures of Adolf Hitler, and men were photographed there in Italian Fascist-style blackshirts, SA-style brownshirts, and Nazi military uniforms. Children were given German literature and shown German movies, many of which had pro-Nazi themes.

According to a court case brought against the German American Settlement League in 1938 for failing to register with New York's Secretary of State – a violation of the Civil Rights Law of 1923, which was enacted to control the Ku Klux Klan – to become a member of the League one had to swear allegiance to Hitler and to the leaders of the German American Bund; the court found against the League. During the trial, a witness was asked to demonstrate how those at the camp saluted the American flag. Initially resistant, he responded by giving the Nazi salute. When asked if this was "the American salute", the witness responded "It will be."

The six defendants, among them the president of the league, Ernst Mueller, were found guilty, as well as their organization. Mueller was sentenced to one year in jail and fined $1,000. His codefendants received one-year suspended sentences and each fined $500. The judge imposed another $10,000 fine on the German American Settlement League. Mueller spent over two weeks in the county jail, before being released pending the outcome of his appeal. The convictions were overturned in November 1938.

According to The Washington Post, the purpose of Camp Siegfried was to "[r]aise the future leaders of America – and make sure they were steeped in Nazi ideals." Journalist John Metcalfe testified to the House Committee on Un-American Activities that it was part of a plan to create a spy and sabotage network within the United States. These future Aryan leaders were not only forced to physically build the camp's infrastructure – so as to avoid hiring union labor, when the unions were, the camp's leaders thought, full of Jews – but were also coerced into having sex with each other in order to breed a new generation of perfect Aryan children.

The German American Bund severed its connection with the German American Settlement League in 1940, and the League took over the Camp with the announcement that henceforth it would be "non-political." Nevertheless, the camp was seized and shut down by the U.S. government when Germany declared war on the United States. It had been protected by the First Amendment until that time, when it became illegal for American citizens to swear allegiance to Germany.

Camp Siegfried was transformed into "German Gardens", a planned community which had been approved by the Town of Brookhaven in 1936. Located along Upper Lake, part of German Gardens – where streets named after Hitler, Joseph Goebbels and Hermann Göring were not changed until 1941 – was later absorbed by Yaphank, while the remainder became Siegfried Park, a 40-acre (16 ha) private community of small bungalows and suburban-type ranch houses with well-kept lawns, where the land under the houses was owned by the German American Settlement League, and no one could buy a house without being approved by the League. Technically a co-op, the League's by-laws included a restrictive covenant that all home-buyers had to be mostly "of German extraction." This was struck down by a federal judge in 2016 as the result of a lawsuit, and the community's bylaws were rewritten to require it to comply with all fair housing laws, at the federal, state and local levels, but the discriminatory practices continued despite this, with the League making it difficult for homeowners to sell. In May 2017, New York state prosecutors announced that they had reached a settlement with the League to end any discriminatory housing policies and practices. According to the state's Attorney General, Eric Schneiderman, the agreement "will once and for all put an end to the GASL's discrimination."

== In popular culture ==
Camp Siegfried, an off-Broadway play based on the historical camp, premiered in 2021. It is set in 1938 and follows the relationship of two American teenagers at the camp.

== See also ==
- Camp Nordland
- Nazism in the United States
