= Joe A. Callaway Award =

New York theater award

The Joe A. Callaway Awards are administered by Actors' Equity Association. They were established in 1989 to honor a male and a female actor for the best performance in a classical play in the New York metropolitan area, selected by a panel of critics. The award is given in January and includes $1000 and a commemorative plaque.

The 2010 Award winners were Lily Rabe and Matthew Rauch.
