= Patriots (play) =

2022 play by Peter Morgan

- West End Poster
- Original language: English
- Written by: Peter Morgan
- Genre: Drama

Premiere
- Date: 12 July 2022
- Place: Almeida Theatre, London
- Directed by: Rupert Goold

Patriots is a dramatic stage play by British playwright Peter Morgan. The play explores the rise and fall of Boris Berezovsky, a powerful Russian oligarch who was instrumental in shaping post-Soviet Russia. Set during the 1990s and early 2000s, the play follows Berezovsky’s meteoric rise from mathematician to billionaire media mogul and kingmaker, as he helps Vladimir Putin ascend to power—only to later become his enemy.

As Berezovsky's influence wanes and Putin consolidates control, the play explores themes of loyalty, ambition, betrayal, and the cost of political power. Morgan’s sharp dialogue and historical insight provide a chilling portrait of modern Russian politics and the moral compromises behind empire-building.

== Productions ==
=== Off-West End (2022) ===
Patriots had its world premiere at the Almeida Theatre in London on 12 July 2022, following previews from 2 July. It played a limited run to 20 August. The cast featured Tom Hollander, Will Keen, Yolanda Kettle, Luke Thallon, Matt Concannon, Stephen Fewell, Ronald Guttman, Aoife Hinds, Sean Kingsley, Paul Kynman, Jessica Temple and Jamael Westman.

=== West End (2023) ===
In August 2022, it was announced that the Almeida production would transfer to the Noël Coward Theatre in the West End. The show began previews on 26 May 2023 with an official opening on 6 June. The show played a 12-week limited engagement, concluding on 19 August.

=== Broadway (2024) ===
In January 2024, it was announced that the show will transfer Broadway for a 12-week limited engagement. Will Keen and Luke Thallon reprised their performances as Vladimir Putin and Roman Abramovich respectively, with Michael Stuhlbarg joining the cast as Boris Berezovsky. Full casting was announced on 27 February. The show began previews on 1 April, at the Ethel Barrymore Theatre and officially opened on 22 April. Sonia Friedman produced while Rupert Goold directed.

== Cast and characters ==
Character	Off-West End	West End	Broadway
Character	2022	2023	2024
Boris Berezovsky	Tom Hollander	Tom Hollander	Michael Stuhlbarg
Vladimir Putin	Will Keen	Will Keen	Will Keen
Roman Abramovich	Luke Thallon	Luke Thallon	Luke Thallon
Assistant/Daniel Kahneman/Captain	Matt Concannon	Matt Concannon	Nick Rehberger
Professor Perelman	Ronald Guttman	Ronald Guttman	Ronald Guttman
Voloshin/Nurse	Sean Kingsley	Sean Kingsley	Peter Bradbury
Korzhakov/Yeltsin/FSB Boss	Paul Kynman	Paul Kynman	Paul Kynman
Anna Berezovsky/Newscaster/Secretary	Jessica Temple	Jessica Temple	Rosie Benton
Alexander Litvinenko	Jamael Westman	Josef Davies	Alex Hurt
Teacher/Newscaster	Stephen Fewell	Howard Cossington	Jeff Biehl
Marina Litvinenko	Yolanda Kettle	Stefanie Martini	Stella Baker
Nina Berezovsky	Yolanda Kettle	Stefanie Martini	Camila Canó-Flavia
Tatiana	Aoife Hinds	Evelyn Miller	Camila Canó-Flavia
Katya	Aoife Hinds	Evelyn Miller	Marianna Gailus

== Awards ==
=== Original London production ===
Year	Award	Category	Nominee	Result	Ref.
2023	Laurence Olivier Awards	Best New Play		Nominated	
2023	Laurence Olivier Awards	Best Actor	Tom Hollander	Nominated	
2023	Laurence Olivier Awards	Best Actor in a Supporting Role	Will Keen	Won	

=== Broadway production ===
Year	Award	Category	Nominee	Result	Ref.
2024	Tony Award	Best Actor in a Play	Michael Stuhlbarg	Nominated	
2024	Drama League Awards	Outstanding Production of a Play		Nominated	
2024	Drama League Awards	Distinguished Performance	Michael Stuhlbarg	Nominated	
2024	Drama League Awards	Outstanding Direction of a Play	Rupert Goold	Nominated	
2024	Outer Critics Circle Award	Outstanding New Broadway Play	Peter Morgan	Nominated	
2024	Outer Critics Circle Award	Outstanding Lead Performer in a Broadway Play	Michael Stuhlbarg	Nominated	
2024	Outer Critics Circle Award	Outstanding Projection Design	Ash J. Woodward	Nominated	
2024	Theatre World Award		Will Keen	Won	
