= The Voysey Inheritance =

Play written by Harley Granville-Barker

The Voysey Inheritance is a play in five acts by the English dramatist Harley Granville-Barker. Written in 1903–1905, it was originally staged at the Royal Court Theatre in 1905 featuring Mabel Hackney, and revived at the same venue in 1965, the Royal Exchange, Manchester in 1989 and at the National Theatre in 1989, and in 2006. In 2006, American playwright David Mamet wrote what a critic for The New York Times called a "canny new adaptation" of the play for New York's Atlantic Theatre Company.

Described by Samuel French as "a witty, impeccably crafted portrait of a family in the midst of a surprisingly modern moral dilemma", its subject is financial fraud, on which Ian Clarke wrote, "in The Voysey Inheritance, the dishonesty implicates not only the individual Voyseys but the institutions, ideology, and economic base of Edwardian England".

== Plot ==
Edward's highly principled world upturns when he discovers the family business he is inheriting has been defrauding its clients for years because his father has been illegally speculating with their money. To compound matters, he quickly discovers his large, scandal-fearing family knew of the crime but allowed it to continue rather than face the shame of public disclosure.

== Quote ==
"Of course it's pleasant and comfortable to keep within the law . . . then the law will look after you. Otherwise you have to look pretty sharp after yourself. You have to cultivate your own sense of right and wrong . . . deal with your own justice. But that makes a bigger man of you, let me tell you."

== See also ==
- Complete text on Internet Archive
