= Measure for Pleasure =

Play by David Grimm

Measure for Pleasure is a play written by David Grimm, and first played in 2006. It is set in the style of a Restoration comedy and concerns the romantic couplings of a host of nobles and servants.

== Plot summary ==
Set in 1751, Measure for Pleasure uses classic farce, including mistaken identities, mismatched lovers, deception and wordplay.

Theater critic Anthony Del Valle summed the plot as follows:

A valet falls in love with a young transvestite prostitute, who has the hots for a womanizing braggart, who desires the affections of a beautiful maiden. There are more pairings and complications, and, miracle of miracles, all lovers are happily united by evening's end.

— Anthony Del Valle, Reality shines through foolishness in 'Measure', Las Vegas Review Journal

== Reception ==
The play has garnered mixed reviews from critics. The New York Times' Charles Ishenwood's review was mostly positive:"Clearly a labor of love for a playwright as enamored of the lively cadences of Restoration and 18th-century English syntax as he is of bawdy punch lines, 'Measure for Pleasure' (...) will tickle, offend or simply bore in measures that will vary according to your taste for blatantly vulgar sexual comedy. Mr. Grimm's studied affection for the genres he's mimicking is impressive. (Previously he has paid tribute to the masters Marlowe and Molière.) But the play is essentially a nasty comedy-club routine performed in silk britches and powdered wigs.".

Anthony Del Valle, reviewing the play in a 2012 creation in the Las Vegas Review-Journal, observed "Las Vegas Little Theatre's 'Measure for Pleasure' is remarkable in that so much has gone right on so many levels. David Grimm's 2006 script is an affectionate, self-mocking salute to Restoration comedy -- the naughty genre that helped 17th century England recover from its Puritan phase. (...)What I found most amazing is that despite all the exaggerated foolishness, the production has a strong reality base. I believed these were characters with genuine needs. It's easy to imagine how torturous this show would be if it were executed by performers who cared only about jokes."
