= Boma (enclosure) =

Form of stockade in sub-Saharan Africa

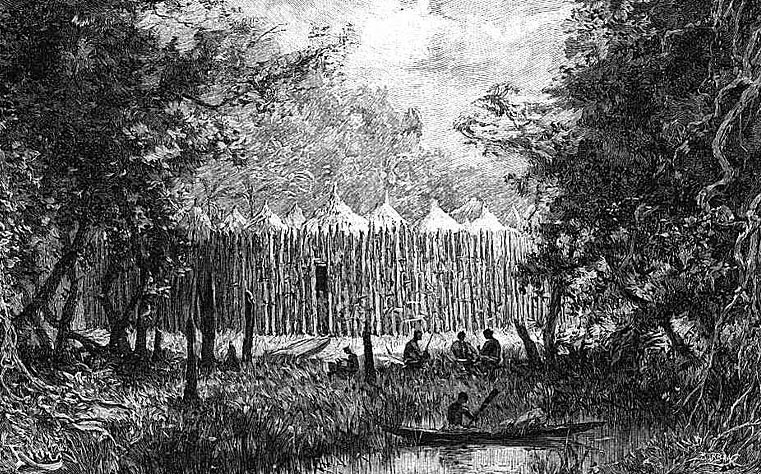
A boma in the forest. This one is a fortified African village. Illustration published in 1892 in Paris in Édouard Charton's Tour du Monde magazine ('Around the World'), to go with an article on the Stairs Expedition to Katanga written from the journal of explorer Christian de Bonchamps.

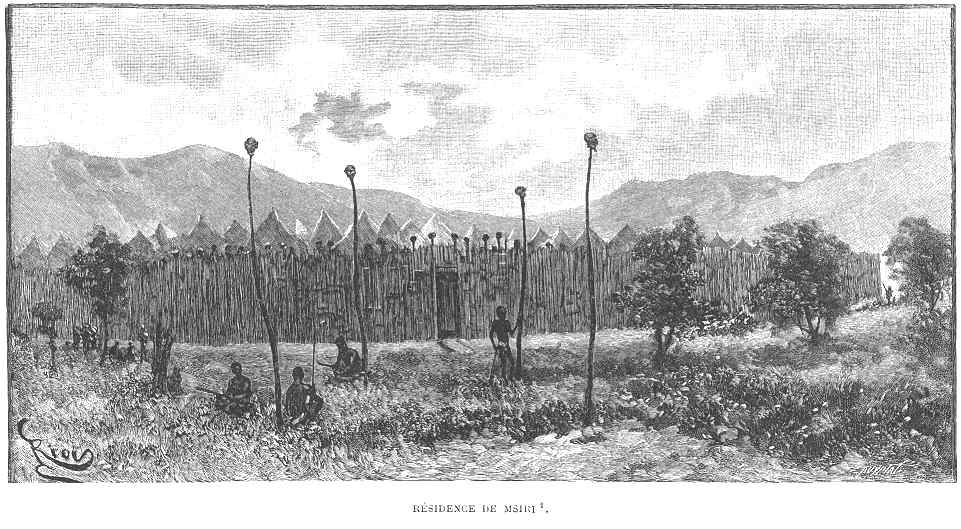
Msiri's boma at Bunkeya.

A boma is a livestock enclosure, community enclosure, stockade, corral, small fort or a district government office, commonly used in many parts of the African Great Lakes region, as well as Central and Southern Africa. It is particularly associated with community decision making. The word originally may be from Bantu or Persian, and it has been incorporated into many African languages, as well as colonial varieties of English, French and German.

As a livestock enclosure, a boma is the equivalent of kraal. The former term is used in areas influenced by the Swahili language, and the latter is employed in areas influenced by Afrikaans.

In the form of fortified villages or camps, bomas were commonplace in Central Africa in the 18th and 19th centuries. They were commonplace throughout Africa, including in areas affected by the slave trade, tribal wars and colonial conquest, and were built and used by both sides.

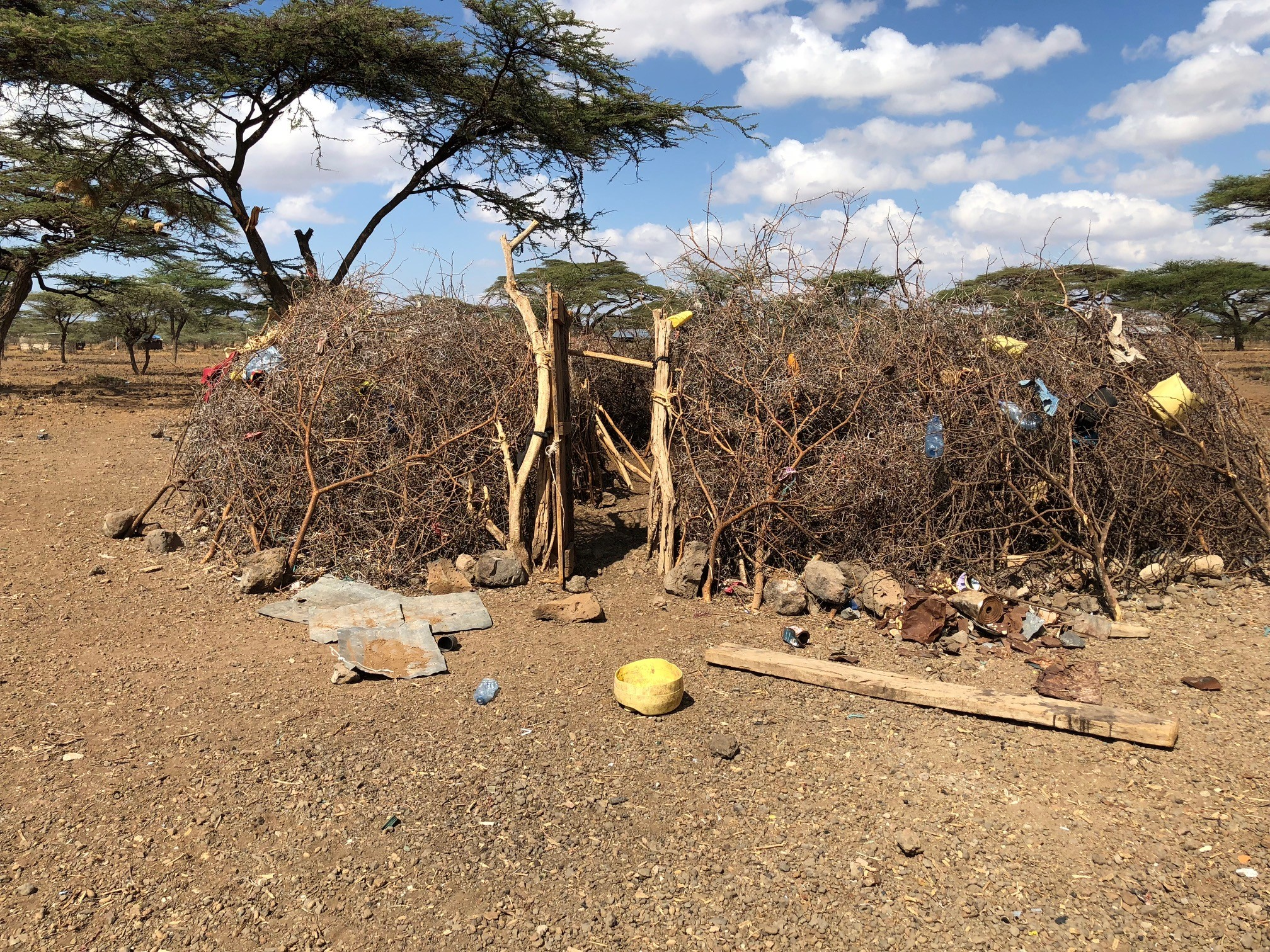
A boma constructed from thorny acacia branches in a rural village in Isiolo County, Kenya, in 2018.

Apart from the neatly built stockades shown in illustrations of bomas, the term, in practice, more often resembled the structure shown in the illustration accompanying this article. In that form, they often were referred to by the likes of J. A. Hunter and Henry Morton Stanley.

Nowadays, the Swahili word boma refers to a homestead, especially within the context of a home that was founded or is headed by a father or grandfather who also owns the estate on which the homestead is located.

== Etymology and backronym ==
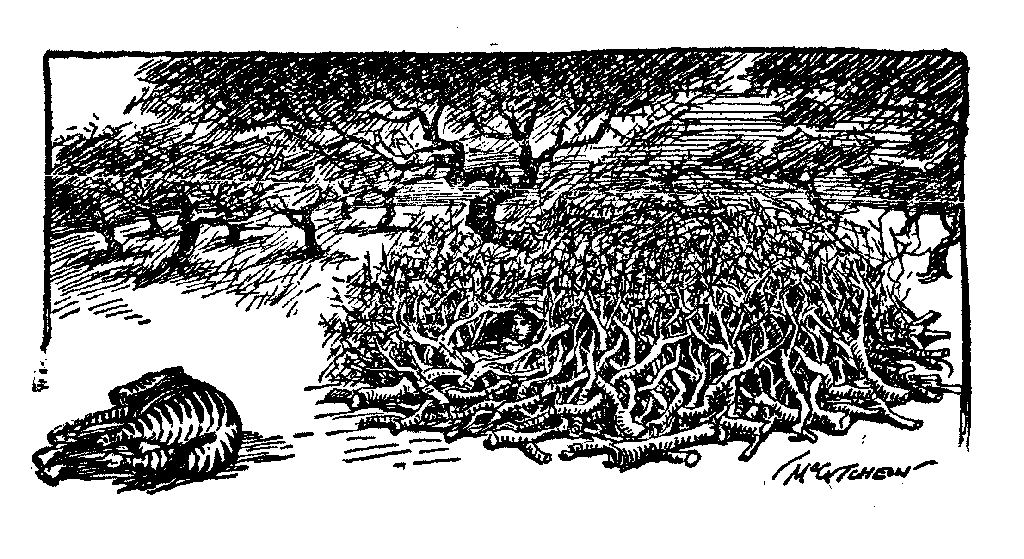
Ambushing lions: "The lion can not get into the boma unless he jumps up and comes in from the top. It is the function of the hunter to prevent this strategic manœuver by killing the lion before he gets in. If he does not, he is likely to find himself engaged in a spirited hand-to-hand fight with an unfriendly lion in a space about as big as the upper berth of a sleeping-car." - John T. McCutcheon, cartoonist for the Chicago Tribune, 1910.

A popular myth told to tourists in the African Great Lakes states that BOMA stood for 'British Overseas Management Administration' or 'British Officers Mess Area' during the colonial era in Africa. The myth holds that the term has since been adopted into Swahili and several other vernacular Bantu languages of former British East Africa (for example, Chichewa and Chitumbuka in Malawi) to mean government in general, or locations of governmental offices, such as district centers.

In fact, the word boma has much deeper roots in languages spoken in the Africa Great Lakes, whether as a word of Bantu origin or a loan word from Persian. The Oxford English Dictionary ascribes the first use in written English to the adventurer Henry Morton Stanley, in his book Through the Dark Continent (1878): 'From the staked bomas..there rise to my hearing the bleating of young calves.' The term is also used throughout Stanley's earlier book How I found Livingstone(1871) '...we pitched our camp, built a boma of thorny acacia, and other tree branches, by stacking them round our camp...' Krapf's A Dictionary of the Suahili Language (1882) defines boma as 'a palisade or stockade serving as a kind of fortification to towns and villages...may consist of stones or poles, or of an impenetrable thicket of thorns,' though he does not give an origin for the word. Boma also appears in Band's 'Deutsches Kolonial-Lexikon' (1920), which indicates the word was in use in Tanganyika long before it fell under the control of the British. Johnson's Standard Swahili-English Dictionary (1939) suggests boma comes from a Persian word, buum, which he says means 'garrison, place where one can dwell in safety.' In Swahili and Sabaki: A Linguistic History, Nurse and Hinnebusch (1993) give iboma, 'defended area,' as either a Great Lakes Bantu innovation or a borrowing from Persian (p. 295). At any rate, the word was in circulation before the British Empire began colonizing.

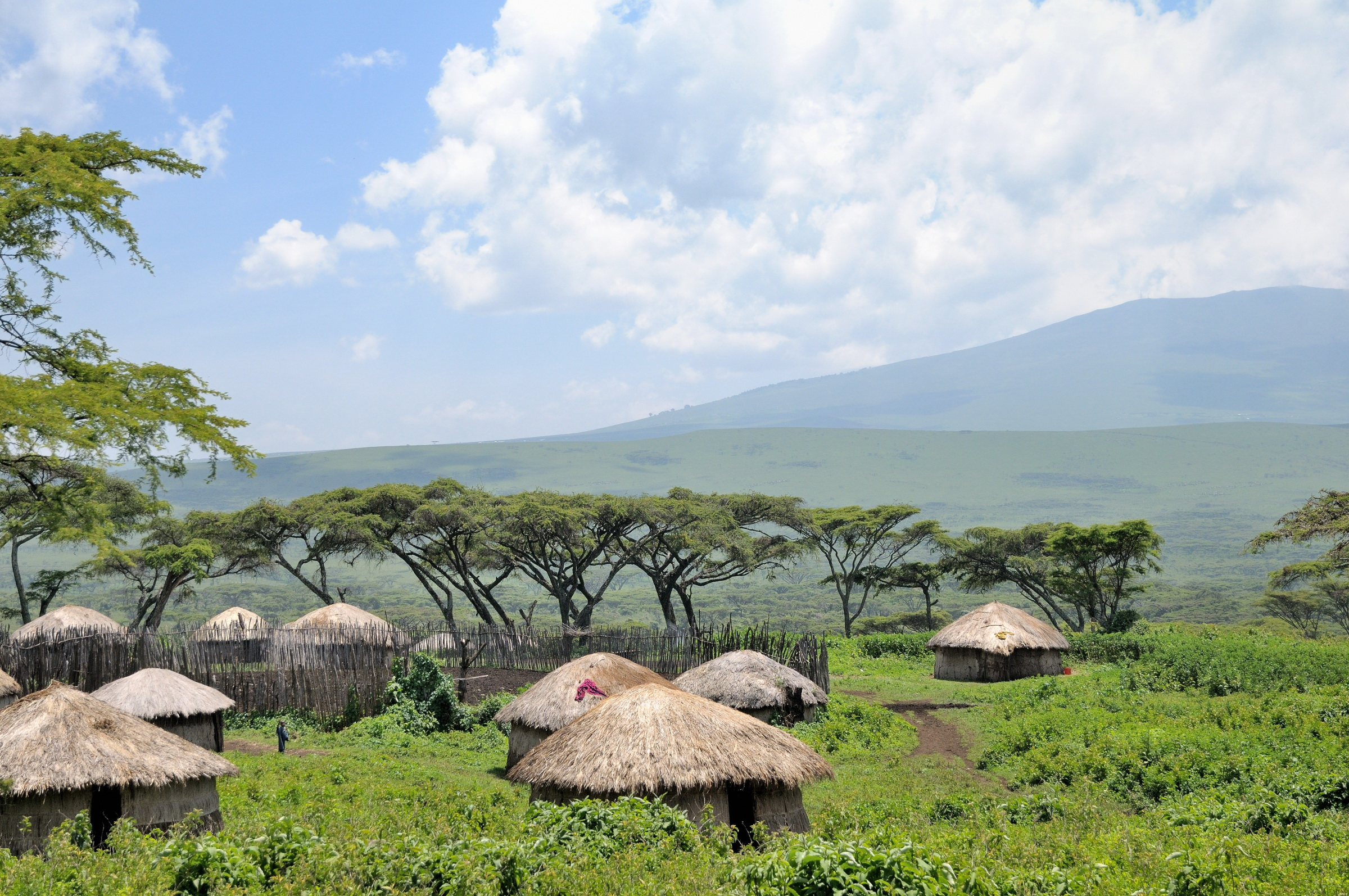
Maasai boma in the Ngorongoro Conservation Area in Tanzania.

Moreover, no such entity as the 'British Overseas Management Administration' ever existed.

Boma is related to the Sanskrit word bhumi which means earth, land, place or soil. It shares a meaning with the English word home. It may be related to the Swahili word hema which means dwelling tent and hama which means to change homes or to migrate.

== Branding ==
=== Kenya ===
- The Bomas of Kenya, a tourist village hosting traditional homesteads and household items from various ethnic groups in Kenya.
- The Boma Nairobi: A hotel in Nairobi built and owned by the Kenya Red Cross Society and affiliated with the Boma Hotel Group.
- Boma Yangu: The brand-name of the Affordable Housing Program implemented by the Government of Kenya beginning 2024.
- Boma, the nickname for Kenya High School, (formerly the European Girls Secondary School) assigned due to the arrangement of the hostels in a semicircle resembling a boma or African homestead.

== See also ==
- Compound (enclosure)
- Kraal
- Stockade
- Zariba
