= Kraal =

Southern African livestock enclosure

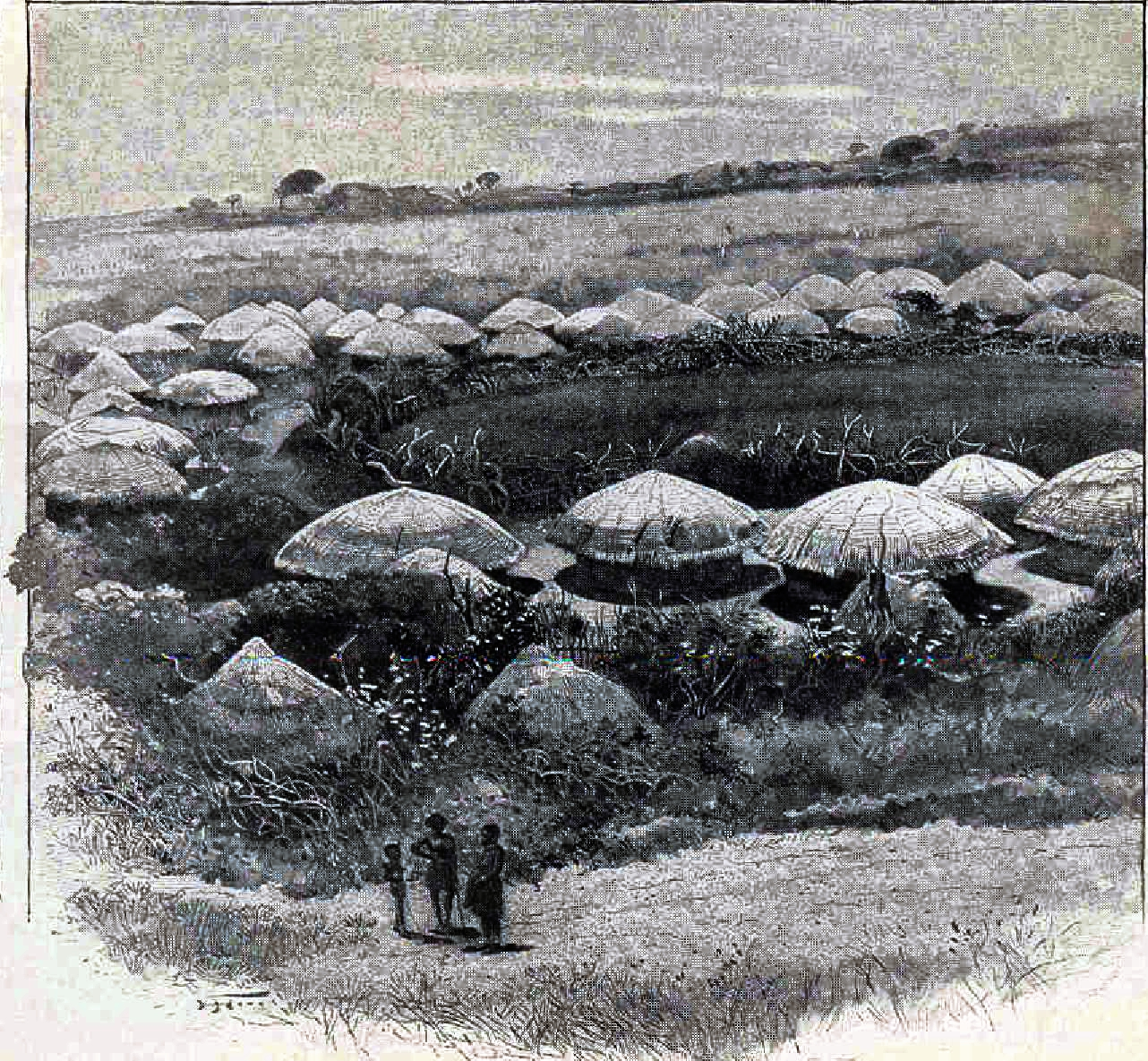
An illustration of a kraal near Bulawayo in the 19th century.

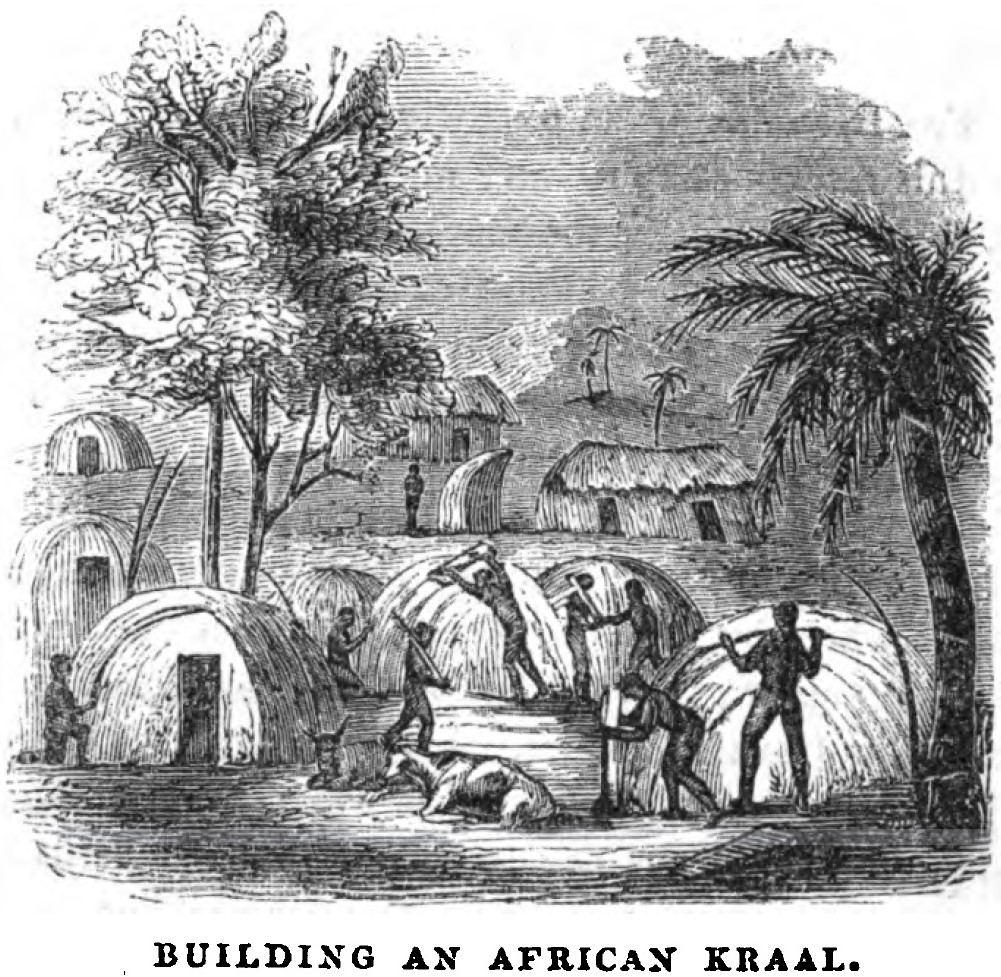
Building an African Kraal (July 1853, X, p.78)

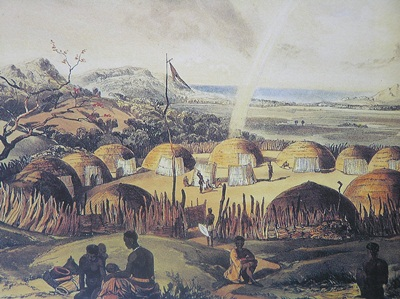
Zulu kraal near Umlazi, Natal

Kraal (also spelled craal or kraul) is a Dutch and Afrikaans word, also used in South African English, for an enclosure for cattle or other livestock, located within a Southern African settlement or village surrounded by a fence of thorn-bush branches, a palisade, mud wall, or other fencing, roughly circular in form. It is similar to a boma in eastern or central Africa.

In Curaçao, another former Dutch colony, the enclosure was called "koraal" which means corral and which in Papiamentu is translated "kura", a word still in use today for any enclosed terrain, like a garden.

== Etymology ==
In the Afrikaans language a kraal is a term derived from the Portuguese word curral, cognate with the Spanish-language corral, which entered into English separately. In Eastern and Central Africa, the equivalent word for a livestock enclosure is boma, but this has taken on wider meanings.

In some Southern African regions, the term Kraal is used in Scouting to refer to the team of Scout Leaders of a group.

== Homestead ==
The term primarily refers to the type of dispersed homestead characteristic of the Nguni-speaking peoples of southern Africa. Although from the period of colonisation, European South Africans and historians commonly referred to the entire settlement as a kraal (Note: in 1894 Theal notes that the word kraal "...is also used to signify a collection of either Hottentot or Bantu Huts...", in 1910 Kidd describes a kraal as "The natives lives in round huts, which are built of wattle and daub. A kraal consists of a number of these huts grouped in a circle or crescent; the cattle-kraal, which is usually a large circular enclosure made of thorn-bush branches, being places in the centre of the circle, or else on the cord of the crescent or horseshoe." In 1913 Pettman notes that kraal may refer to "Any native village or collection of huts"), ethnographers have long recognised that its proper referent is the animal pen area within a homestead. Modern ethnographers call the several human dwellings within a homestead (Xhosa: umzi, Zulu: umuzi, Sotho: mutsi, Swazi: umuti) houses (singular indlu; plural Xhosa and Zulu izindlu, Sotho dintlu, Swati tindlu).

Folds for animals and enclosures made specially for defensive purposes are also called kraals.

== Zulu kraals ==
For the Zulu people, the kraal, or isibaya, in the Zulu language, acts as a homestead, a site for ritual worship, and as a defensive position. It's laid out as a circular arrangement of beehive-shaped huts called iQukwane, which were traditionally constructed by women, surrounding a cattle enclosure. They are always built on one of Zululand's many hills, orientated downwards. The term "kraal" refers both to the village itself and the central cattle enclosure.

=== Layout ===
Kraals are built on a hill, with the entrance facing the bottom of the hill for sanitary, defensive, and ritual purposes. There is an outside wooden fence that encompasses the entire kraal, and then an interior one for the cattle enclosure. The hut opposite of the entrance was the home of either the chief's mother or the chief himself. The huts closest to the chief's were those of his wives, with the great wife closest to his own. Closer to the entrance, the huts of the sons of the village were placed on the left side and the huts of the daughters of the village on the right. In each hut would be an umsamo, a special ritual area, with the most important umsamo located in the chief's hut. The huts nearest the entrance were used for guests and visitors. Additionally, there would be multiple watchtowers in the kraal.

=== Ritual uses ===
The umsamo within the chief's hut was an important site for communicating with ancestor spirits. Similarly, there would be a site on the cattle enclosure's west side for performance of rituals directed at ancestors. These rituals were usually carried out by the headman, an important ceremonial position in traditional Zulu society.

== See also ==
- Animal pound
