= List of Latin phrases (D) =

This page is one of a series listing English translations of notable Latin phrases, such as veni, vidi, vici and et cetera. Some of the phrases are themselves translations of Greek phrases, as ancient Greek rhetoric and literature started centuries before the beginning of Latin literature in ancient Rome.

Latin	Translation	Notes
da Deus fortunae	O God, give fortune/happiness	A traditional greeting of Czech brewers.
da mihi factum, dabo tibi ius	Give me the fact, I will give you the law	Also da mihi facta, dabo tibi ius (plural "facta" (facts) for the singular "factum"). A legal principle of Roman law that parties to a suit should present the facts and the judge will rule on the law that governs them. Related to iura novit curia (the court knows the law).
damnant quod non intellegunt	They condemn what they do not understand	Paraphrase of Quintilianus, De Institutione Oratoria, Book 10, chapter 1, 26: "Modesto tamen et circumspecto iudicio de tantis viris pronuntiandum est, ne, quod plerisque accidit, damnent quae non intellegunt." [Yet students must pronounce with diffidence and circumspection on the merits of such illustrious characters, lest, as is the case with many, they condemn what they do not understand. (translated by Rev. John Selby Watson)
damnatio ad bestias	condemnation to [the] beasts	Colloquially, "thrown to the lions".
damnatio memoriae	damnation of memory	The ancient Roman custom by which it was pretended that disgraced Romans, especially former emperors, never existed, by eliminating all records and likenesses of them.
damnum absque injuria	damage without injury	Meaning a loss that results from no one's wrongdoing. In Roman law, a person is not responsible for unintended, consequential injury to another that results from a lawful act. This protection does not necessarily apply to unintended damage caused by one's negligence or folly.
damnum fatale	damage through fate	A loss arising from an inevitable accident where individual persons cannot be held legally liable for damages.
dat deus incrementum, or, deus dat incrementum	God gives growth	Motto of several schools.
data venia	with due respect / given the excuse	Used before disagreeing with someone.
datum perficiemus munus	We shall accomplish the mission assigned	Motto of Batalhão de Operações Policiais Especiais (BOPE), Rio de Janeiro, Brazil.
de bene esse	as well done	In law, a de bene esse deposition is used to preserve the testimony of a witness who is expected not to be available to appear at trial and be cross-examined.
de bonis asportatis	carrying goods away	In law, trespass de bonis asportatis was the traditional name for larceny, i.e., the unlawful theft of chattels (moveable goods).
de dato	of the date	Used, e.g., in "as we agreed in the meeting d.d. 26th May 2006".
de facto	by deed	Said of something that is the actual state of affairs, in contrast to something's legal or official standing, which is described as de jure. De facto refers to "the way things really are" rather than what is officially presented as the fact of the matter in question.
de fideli	with faithfulness	A clerk of a court makes this declaration when he is appointed, by which he promises to perform his duties faithfully as a servant of the court.
de fideli administratione	of faithful administration	Describes an oath taken to faithfully administer the duties of a job or office, like that taken by a court reporter.
de futuro	regarding the future	Usually used in the context of "at a future time".
de gustibus non est disputandum	Of tastes there is nothing to be disputed	Less literally, "there is no accounting for taste", because they are judged subjectively and not objectively: everyone has their own and none deserve preeminence. The complete phrase is "de gustibus et coloribus non est disputandum" ("when we talk about tastes and colours there is nothing to be disputed"). Probably of Scholastic origin; see Wiktionary.
de integro	again, a second time	
de jure	by law	"Official", in contrast with de facto; analogous to "in principle", whereas de facto is to "in practice". In other contexts, it can mean "according to law", "by right", and "legally".
de lege ferenda	of/from law to be passed	
de lege lata	of/from law passed / of/from law in force	
de medietate linguae	of half-tongue	from [a person's] language [group]; party jury; the right to a jury disproportionally chosen from the accused's ethnic group; see struck jury.
de minimis non curat lex	The law does not care about the smallest things.	A court does not care about small, trivial things. A case must have some importance in order for a court to hear it. See "de minimis non curat praetor". Also used as an adjective: "The court found that the alleged conduct was de minimis."
de minimis non curat praetor	The commander does not care about the smallest things.	Also, "The chief magistrate does not concern himself with trifles." Trivial matters are no concern of a high official; cf. aquila non capit muscas (the eagle does not catch flies). Sometimes rex (king) or lex (law) is used in place of praetor.
de mortuis aut bene aut nihil	about the dead, either well or nothing	Less literally, "speak well of the dead or not at all"; cf. de mortuis nil nisi bonum.
de mortuis nil nisi bonum	about the dead, nothing unless a good thing	From de mortuis nil nisi bonum dicendum est ("nothing must be said about the dead except the good"), attributed by Diogenes Laërtius to Chilon. In legal contexts, this quotation is used with the opposite meaning: defamation of a deceased person is not a crime. In other contexts, it refers to taboos against criticizing the recently deceased.
de nobis fabula narratur	About us is the story told	Thus: "their story is our story". Originally it referred to the end of Rome's dominance. Now often used when comparing any current situation to a past story or event.
de novo	from the new	"Anew" or "afresh". In law, a trial de novo is a retrial of the issues as though they had not been tried before. In biology, de novo means newly synthesized, and a de novo mutation is a mutation that neither parent possessed or transmitted. In economics, de novo refers to newly founded companies, and de novo banks are state banks that have been in operation for five years or less. (Cf. ex novo)
de omni re scibili et quibusdam aliis	about every knowable thing, and even certain other things	The Italian scholar Giovanni Pico della Mirandola of the 15th century wrote the De omni re scibili ("concerning every knowable thing") part, and a wag added et quibusdam aliis ("and even certain other things").
de omnibus dubitandum	Be suspicious of everything / doubt everything	Attributed to the French philosopher René Descartes. It was also Karl Marx's favorite motto and a title of one of Søren Kierkegaard's works, De omnibus dubitandum est.
de oppresso liber	free from having been oppressed	Loosely, "to liberate the oppressed". Motto of the United States Army Special Forces.
de praescientia Dei	from/through the foreknowledge of God	Motto of the Worshipful Company of Barbers.
de profundis	from the depths	Meaning from out of the depths of misery or dejection. From the Latin translation of the Vulgate Bible of Psalm 130, of which it is a traditional title in Roman Catholic liturgy.
de re	about/regarding the matter	In logic, de dicto statements regarding the truth of a proposition are distinguished from de re statements regarding the properties of a thing itself.
decessit sine prole	died without issue	Used in genealogical records, often abbreviated as d.s.p., to indicate a person who died without having had any children.
decessit sine prole legitima	died without legitimate issue	Used in genealogical records, often abbreviated as d.s.p.l., to indicate a person who died without having had any children with a spouse.
decessit sine prole mascula legitima	died without legitimate male issue	Used in genealogical records in cases of nobility or other hereditary titles, often abbreviated as d.s.p.m.l. or d.s.p.m. legit, to indicate a person who died without having had any legitimate male children (indicating there were illegitimate male children)
decessit sine prole mascula superstite	died without surviving male issue	Used in genealogical records, often abbreviated as d.s.p.m., to indicate a person who died without having had any male children who survived, i.e. outlived him.
decessit sine prole superstite	died without surviving issue	Used in genealogical records, often abbreviated as d.s.p.s., to indicate a person who died without having had any children who survived, i.e. outlived him.
decessit vita matris	died in the lifetime of the mother	Used in genealogical records, often abbreviated as d.v.m., to indicate a person who predeceased his or her mother.
decessit vita patris	died in the lifetime of the father	Used in genealogical records, often abbreviated as d.v.p., to indicate a person who predeceased his or her father.
decus et tutamen	an ornament and a safeguard	A phrase from Virgil's Aeneid. Inscription on British one pound coins. Originally inscribed on coins of the 17th century, it refers to the inscribed edge of the coin as a protection against the clipping of its precious metal.
defendit numerus	There is safety in numbers	
Defensor Fortis	Defender of the Force	Official motto of the United States Air Force Security Forces (Security Police).
Dei gratia	By the grace of God	Part of the full style of a monarch historically considered to be ruling by divine right, notably in the style of the English and British monarch since 1521
Dei gratia rex	By the Grace of God, King	Also Dei gratia regina ("By the Grace of God, Queen"). Abbreviated as D G REX on British and Canadian coins. Also occurs on coins of the Holy Roman Empire such as the Otto Adelheid Pfennig.
Dei sub numine viget	Under God's Spirit she flourishes	Motto of Princeton University, Princeton, New Jersey, United States.
delectatio morosa	peevish delight	In Catholic theology, pleasure taken in a sinful thought or imagination, such as brooding on sexual images. As voluntary and complacent erotic fantasizing, without attempt to suppress such thoughts, it is distinct from actual sexual desire.
delegata potestas non potest delegari	Delegated powers can not be [further] delegated	A legal principle whereby one to whom certain powers were delegated may not ipso facto re-delegate them to another. A distinction may be had between delegated powers and the additional power to re-delegate them.
delirant isti Romani	They are mad, those Romans[!]	A Latin translation of René Goscinny's phrase in French ils sont fous, ces romains! or Italian Sono pazzi questi Romani. Cf. SPQR, which Obelix frequently used in the Asterix comics.
Deo ac veritati	for God and for truth	Motto of Colgate University.
Deo confidimus	In God we trust	Motto of Somerset College.
Deo Dante Dedi	God having given I gave	Motto of Charterhouse School.
Deo domuique	For God and for home	Motto of Methodist Ladies' College, Melbourne.
Deo et patriae	For God and country	Motto of Regis High School in New York City, New York, United States.
Deo gratias	Thanks [be] to God	A frequent phrase in the Roman Catholic liturgy, used especially after the recitation of a lesson, the Last Gospel at Mass or as a response to Ite, missa est / Benedicamus Domino.
Deo juvante	with God's help	Motto of Monaco and its monarch, which is inscribed on the royal arms.
Deo non fortuna	by God, not fortune/luck	Motto of the Epsom College in Surrey, England and Fairham Freemasons Lodge No.8002 in the province of Nottinghamshire.
Deo optimo maximo (DOM)	To the best and greatest God	Derived from the pagan Iupiter optimo maximo ("to the best and greatest Jupiter"). Printed on bottles of Bénédictine liqueur.
Deo patriae litteris	For God, country, [and] learning	motto of Scotch College, Melbourne
Deo regi vicino	For God, king and neighbour	motto of Bromsgrove School
Deo vindice	with God as protector / with an avenging God	motto of the defunct Confederate States of America
Deo volente	God willing	This was often used in conjunction with a signature at the end of letters. It was used in order to signify that "God willing" this letter will get to you safely, "God willing" the contents of this letter come true. As an abbreviation (simply "D.V.") it is often found in personal letters (in English) of the early 1900s, employed to generally and piously qualify a given statement about a future planned action, that it will be carried out, so long as God wills it (see James 4:13–15, which encourages this way of speaking); cf. inshallah. Motto of Southern Illinois University Carbondale.
descensus in cuniculi cavum	The descent into the cave of the rabbit	Down the rabbit hole; backtranslation, not a genuine Latin phrase; see Down the rabbit hole.
desiderantes meliorem patriam	they desired a better land	From Hebrews 11:16; the motto of the Order of Canada.
Deus adiuta Romanis	God help the Romans	An inscription minted on Eastern Roman hexagrams during the Byzantine–Sasanian War of 602–628.
Deus caritas est	God Is Love	Title and first words of the first encyclical of Pope Benedict XVI. For other meanings see Deus caritas est (disambiguation).
deus ex machina	a god from a machine	From the Greek ἀπὸ μηχανῆς θεός (apò mēchanēs theós). A contrived or artificial solution, usually to a literary plot. Refers to the practice in Greek drama of lowering by crane (the mechanê) an actor playing a god or goddess onto the stage to resolve an insuperable conflict in the plot. The device is most commonly associated with Euripides.
Deus lux mea est	God is my light	The motto of The Catholic University of America.
Deus meumque jus	God and my right	The principal motto of Scottish Rite Freemasonry. See also Dieu et mon droit.
Deus nobis haec otia fecit	God has given us these days of leisure	Motto of the city of Liverpool, England.
Deus nobiscum	God with us	Motto of Methodist College Belfast
Deus nolens exitus	Get results, whether God likes it or not	Literally: Results, God unwilling. A modern creation with questionable grammar; used in James Islington's The Will of the Many (2023) from his Hierarchy series; title of an episode of the podcast The Sheridan Tapes.
Deus otiosus	God at leisure	
Deus spes nostra	God is our hope	The motto of Sir Thomas de Boteler, founder of Boteler Grammar School in Warrington in 1526.
Deus vult	God wills it	The principal slogan of the Crusades. Motto of Bergen Catholic High School in New Jersey, United States.
Dicebamus hesterna die...	[As] we were saying yesterday...	Attributed to Fray Luis de León, the beginning of his first lecture after resuming his professorship at Salamanca University following four years of imprisonment by the Inquisition
dictatum erat (dict)	as previously stated	A recent academic substitution for the spacious and inconvenient phrase "as previously stated". Literally, has been stated. Compare also "dicta prius"; literally, said previously.
dicto simpliciter	[from] a maxim, simply	I.e. "from a rule without exception." Short for a dicto simpliciter, the a is often dropped because it is confused with the English indefinite article. A dicto simpliciter occurs when an acceptable exception is ignored or eliminated. For example, the appropriateness of using opiates is contingent on suffering extreme pain. To justify the recreational use of opiates by referring to a cancer patient or to justify arresting said patient by comparing him to the recreational user would be a dicto simpliciter.
dictum factum	what is said is done	Motto of United States Navy Fighter Squadron VF-194.
dictum meum pactum	my word [is] my bond	Motto of the London Stock Exchange.
diem perdidi	I have lost the day	From the Roman Emperor Titus. Recorded in the biography of him by Suetonius in Lives of the Twelve Caesars.
dies irae	Day of wrath	Reference to the Judgment Day in Christian eschatology. The title of a famous Medieval Latin hymn by Tommaso da Celano in the 13th century and used in the Requiem Mass.
dies non juridicum	Day without judiciary	Days under common law (traditionally Sunday), during which no legal process can be served and any legal judgment is invalid. The English Parliament first codified this precept in the reign of King Charles II.
dies tenebrosa sicut nox	a day as dark as night	First entry in Annales Cambriae, for the year 447.
dimidium facti, qui coepit, habet	He has half the deed done, who has made a beginning.	From the second letter by Horace in his First Book of Letters: Dimidium facti, qui coepit, habet; sapere aude, incipe. [... dare to know, begin].
dirigo	I direct	In Classical Latin, "I arrange". Motto of the State of Maine, United States; based on a comparison of the State to the star Polaris.
dis aliter visum	It seemed otherwise to the gods	In other words, the gods have ideas different from those of mortals, and so events do not always occur in the way persons wish them to. Cf. Virgil, Aeneid, 2: 428. Also cf. "Man proposes and God disposes" and "My Thoughts are not your thoughts, neither are your ways My ways", Isaiah 55, 8–9.
dis manibus sacrum (D.M.S.)	Sacred to the ghost-gods	Refers to the Manes, i.e. Roman spirits of the dead. Loosely, "to the memory of". A conventional pagan inscription preceding the name of the deceased on their tombstone; often shortened to dis manibus (D.M.), "for the ghost-gods". Preceded in some earlier monuments by hic situs est (H. S. E.), "he lies here".
disce aut discede	learn or depart / learn or leave	Motto of Royal College, Colombo and of King's School, Rochester.
disce ut semper victurus, vive ut cras moriturus	Learn as if [you will] live forever; live as if [you will] die tomorrow.	Attributed to St. Edmund of Abingdon; first seen in Isidoro de Sevilla
discendo discimus	while learning we learn	See also § docendo discitur
discere faciendo	learn by doing	Motto of the three California Polytechnic State Universities of San Luis Obispo, Pomona, and Humboldt, United States.
disiecta membra	scattered limbs	I.e., "scattered remains". Paraphrased from Horace, Satires, 1, 4, 62, where it is written "disiecti membra poetae" (limbs of a scattered poet).
ditat Deus	God enriches	Motto of the State of Arizona, United States, adopted in 1911. Probably derived from the translation of the Vulgate Bible of Genesis 14: 23.
divide et impera	divide and rule / "divide and conquer"	A Roman maxim adopted by Roman Dictator Julius Caesar, King Louis XI of France and the Italian political author Niccolò Machiavelli.
dixi	I have spoken	A popular, eloquent expression, usually used in the end of a speech. The implied meaning is that the speaker has said all that had to be said and thus the argument is completed.
["...", ...] dixit	["...", ...] said	Used to attribute a statement or opinion to its author, rather than the speaker.
do ut des	I give that you may give	Often said or written of sacrifices, in which one "gives" and expects a return from the gods.
docendo discitur	It is learned by teaching / one learns by teaching	Attributed to Seneca the Younger.
docendo disco, scribendo cogito	I learn by teaching, I think by writing	
doli capax	capable of guilt	person's ability to commit a wrongful act with the knowledge that it is wrong; cf. doli incapax.
dolus generalis	general intent	
dolus specialis	special intent	"The ... concept is particular to a few civil law systems and cannot sweepingly be equated with the notions of 'special' or 'specific intent' in common law systems. Of course, the same might equally be said of the concept of 'specific intent', a notion used in the common law almost exclusively within the context of the defense of voluntary intoxication." (Genocide scholar William A. Schabas)
Domine dirige nos	O Lord, guide us	Motto of the City of London, England.
Domine salvum fac Regem	O Lord, save the king	Psalm 20, 10.
Domine salvam fac Reginam	O Lord, save the queen	After Psalm 20, 10.
Dominica in albis [depositis]	Sunday in [Setting Aside the] White Garments	Latin name of the Octave of Easter in the Roman Catholic liturgy.
Dominium maris baltici	Dominion over the Baltic Sea	The territorial aim of the Danish and Swedish kingdoms during the Late Medieval and Early Modern Period to rule over the Baltic Sea
Dominus fortitudo nostra	The Lord is our strength	Motto of the Southland College, Philippines. Psalm 28, 8.
Dominus illuminatio mea	The Lord is my light	Motto of the University of Oxford, England. Psalm 27, 1.
Dominus pastor	The Lord is [our] shepherd	Motto of St. John's College and Prep School, Harare, Zimbabwe. After Psalm 23, 1.
Dominus vobiscum	The Lord be with you.	A phrase used in the Roman Catholic liturgy, and sometimes in its sermons and homilies, and a general form of greeting among and towards members of Catholic organizations. See also Pax vobiscum.
dona nobis pacem	give us peace	Often set to music, either by itself or as the final phrase of the Agnus Dei prayer of the Holy Mass.
donatio mortis causa	a donation in expectation of death	A legal concept in which a person in imminent mortal danger need not satisfy the otherwise requisite consideration to effect a testamentary donation, i.e., a donation by instituting or modifying a will.
draco dormiens nunquam titillandus	a sleeping dragon is never to be tickled	Motto of the fictional Hogwarts School of Witchcraft and Wizardry of the Harry Potter series; translated more loosely in the books as "never tickle a sleeping dragon".
dramatis personae	the parts/characters of the play	More literally, "the masks of the drama"; the cast of characters of a dramatic work.
duae tabulae rasae in quibus nihil scriptum est	two blank slates with nothing written upon them	Stan Laurel, inscription for the fan club logo of The Sons of the Desert.
ducimus	we lead	Motto of the Royal Canadian Infantry Corps.
ducit amor patriae	love of country leads me	Motto of the 51st Battalion, Far North Queensland Regiment, Australia.
ducunt volentem fata, nolentem trahunt	the fates lead the willing and drag the unwilling	Attributed to Lucius Annaeus Seneca (Sen. Ep. 107.11).
ductus exemplo	leadership by example	Motto of the United States Marine Corps Officer Candidates School, at the base in Quantico, Virginia, United States.
dulce bellum inexpertis	war is sweet to the inexperienced	Meaning: "war may seem pleasant to those who have never been involved in it, though the experienced know better". Erasmus of Rotterdam.
dulce est desipere in loco	It is sweet on occasion to play the fool. / It is pleasant to relax once in a while.	Horace, Odes 4, 12, 28. Also used by George Knapton for the portrait of Sir Bourchier Wrey, 6th Baronet in 1744.
dulce et decorum est pro patria mori	It is sweet and honorable to die for the fatherland.	Horace, Odes 3, 2, 13. Also used by Wilfred Owen for the title of a poem regarding World War I, Dulce et Decorum est (calling it "the old Lie").
dulce et utile	a sweet and useful thing / pleasant and profitable	Horace, Ars Poetica: poetry must be dulce et utile, i.e., both enjoyable and instructive.
dulce periculum	danger is sweet	Horace, Odes, 3 25, 16. Motto of the Scottish clan MacAulay.
dulcius ex asperis	sweeter after difficulties	Motto of the Scottish clan Fergusson.
dum cresco spero	I hope when I grow	Motto of The Ravensbourne School.
dum Roma deliberat Saguntum perit	while Rome debates, Saguntum is in danger	Used when someone has been asked for urgent help, but responds with no immediate action. Similar to Hannibal ante portas, but referring to a less personal danger.
dum spiro spero	while I breathe, I hope	Cicero. Motto of the State of South Carolina. Motto of the Clan MacLennan.
dum vita est, spes est	while there is life, there is hope	
dum vivimus servimus	while we live, we serve	Motto of Presbyterian College.
dum vivimus, vivamus	while we live, let us live	An encouragement to embrace life." Emily Dickinson used the line in a whimsical valentine written to William Howland in 1852 and subsequently published in the Springfield Daily Republican:
duos habet et bene pendentes	he has two, and they dangle nicely	According to legend, the words spoken by the cardinal verifying that a newly-elected pope was a man, in a test employed after the reign of pope Joan.
dura lex sed lex	[the] law [is] harsh, but [it is the] law	A shortening of quod quidem perquam durum est, sed ita lex scripta est ("which indeed is extremely harsh, but thus was the law written"). Ulpian, quoted in the Digesta Iustiniani, Roman jurist of the 3rd century AD.
dura mater	tough mother	The outer covering of the brain.
durante bene placito	during good pleasure	Meaning: "serving at the pleasure of the authority or officer who appointed". A Mediaeval legal Latin phrase.
durante munere	while in office	For example, the Governor General of Canada is durante munere the Chancellor and Principal Companion of the Order of Canada.
dux	leader	
dux bellorum	leader of wars	description of King Arthur in Historia Brittonum (The History of the Britons); used as title for a 2012 board war game set in the age of King Arthur.
