= Calicut University Employees Union =

University of Calicut organization

Calicut University Employees Union is the largest organization of the employees of the University of Calicut.

== History ==
On 20 March 1968, employees of the Kerala University Centres formed the Calicut University Centre of non-teaching Staff Union. On 10 February 1970, this organization became the Calicut University Employees Union.

In 1970, the university attempted to fill higher posts by deputation, denying eligible promotion to the existing staff members. The union successfully blocked this action. The state employees and teachers who began striking on 30 January 1970 demanding implementation of DA at central rates also witnessed participation of Calicut University staff en bloc. The union also functioned as a member organization of the Kozhikode-based workers' co-ordination council during this period.

In January 1971, the union went on strike, demanding service and wage parity as per the Kerala University pattern and the creation of new posts ended successfully.

On 22 December 1972, the union opposed the suspension of Smt. Anjelina George, an employee of the Commerce Department. Declaring prohibitory order, university authorities and the state government sent the police on campus. The strike went on for 17 days and the state government amended the Kerala Service Rules (KSR), adding Article 58 (A) to implement dies non. In January 1973, the Achutha Menon Ministry used this rule to suppress the employee strike for pay revision.

In February 1982, the union started the Kutil Kettal (making hut) campaign to draw attention to the problem of residential accommodation. It resulted in the construction of working men's and women's hostels.

Struggle for the creation of new posts after proper assessment of the employees' workloads also came to a successful end. When these norms these were violated in 1992, the union put up strong resistance and agitation.

The struggle against the formation of the Pre Degree Board in 1986, which went on for 54 days, was built up by the Confederation of University Organizations through relentless campaigning. It drew its energy and implication mainly from the Calicut University Employees Union. The movement, which developed into a mass agitation, paved the way for the downfall of the then United Democratic Front government and swearing in of the Left Democratic Front Ministry.

The black decree promulgated by the Antony Government in 2002 torpedoing major rights and benefits acquired by the working class of Kerala through strikes for many years led to great resistance in which the Union had an incomparable role.

Recently the union campaigned continuously demanding the ouster of Vice-Chancellor M. Abdul Salam and dismissal of the nominated syndicate in the wake of the revelations of attempts to offer land to private agencies.
