= List of Latin phrases (I) =

This page is one of a series listing English translations of notable Latin phrases, such as veni, vidi, vici and et cetera. Some of the phrases are themselves translations of Greek phrases, as ancient Greek rhetoric and literature started centuries before the beginning of Latin literature in ancient Rome.

The classical Latin alphabet did not have the letter "J". Although many Latin words starting with the letter "I" are now often spelled with "J", this list mainly uses the spelling with "I".

Latin	Translation	Notes
I, Vitelli, dei Romani sono belli	Go, O Vitellius, at the war sound of the Roman god	Perfectly correct Latin sentence usually reported as funny by modern Italians because the same exact words, in Italian, mean "Romans' calves are beautiful", which has a ridiculously different meaning.
ibidem (ibid.)	in the same place	Usually used in bibliographic citations to refer to the last source previously referenced.
id est (i.e.)	that is (literally "it is")	"That is (to say)" in the sense of "that means" and "which means", or "in other words", "namely", or sometimes "in this case", depending on the context.
id quod plerumque accidit	that which generally happens	Phrase used in legal language to indicate the most probable outcome from an act, fact, event or cause
idem (id.)	the same	Used to refer to something that has already been cited; ditto. See also ibidem.
idem quod (i.q.)	the same as	Not to be confused with an intelligence quotient.
Idus Martiae	the Ides of March	In the Roman calendar, the Ides of March refers to the 15th day of March. In modern times, the term is best known as the date on which Julius Caesar was assassinated in 44 BC; the term has come to be used as a metaphor for impending doom.
Jesu juva (J.J.)	Jesus, help!	Used by Johann Sebastian Bach at the beginning of his compositions, which he ended with "S.D.G." (Soli Deo gloria). Compare Besiyata Dishmaya.
Iesus Nazarenus Rex Iudaeorum (INRI)	Jesus the Nazarene, King of the Jews	From Vulgate; John 19:19. John 19:20 states that this inscription was written in three languages—Aramaic, Latin and Greek—at the top of the cross during the crucifixion of Jesus.
igitur qui desiderat pacem, praeparet bellum	Therefore whoever desires peace, let him prepare for war	Publius Flavius Vegetius Renatus, De re militari; similar to si vis pacem, para bellum and in pace ut sapiens aptarit idonea bello.
igne natura renovatur integra	through fire, nature is reborn whole	An alchemical aphorism invented as an alternate meaning for the acronym INRI.
igni ferroque	with fire and iron	Phrase describing scorched earth tactics. Also rendered as igne atque ferro, ferro ignique, and other variations.
ignis aurum probat	fire tests gold	Phrase referring to the refining of character through difficult circumstances
ignis fatuus	foolish fire	Will-o'-the-wisp.
ignorantia juris non excusat (or ignorantia legis non excusat or ignorantia legis neminem excusat)	ignorance of the law is no excuse	Legal principle whereby ignorance of a law does not allow one to escape liability
ignoratio elenchi	ignorance of the issue	The logical fallacy of irrelevant conclusion: making an argument that, while possibly valid, doesn't prove or support the proposition it claims to. An ignoratio elenchi that is an intentional attempt to mislead or confuse the opposing party is known as a red herring. Elenchi is from the Greek elenchos.
ignotum per ignotius	unknown by means of the more unknown	An explanation that is less clear than the thing to be explained. Synonymous with obscurum per obscurius.
ignotus (ign.)	unknown	
illum oportet crescere me autem minui	He must become greater; I must become less	In the Gospel of John 3:30, a phrase said by John the Baptist after baptizing Jesus. Motto of Saint John the Baptist Catholic School, San Juan, Metro Manila.
imago Dei	image of God	From the religious concept that man was created in "God's image".
imitatio dei	imitation of a god	A principle, held by several religions, that believers should strive to resemble their god(s).
imperium in imperio	an order within an order	1. Group of people who owe utmost fealty to their leader(s), subordinating the interests of the larger group to the authority of the internal group's leader(s).; 2. A "fifth column" organization operating against the organization within which they seemingly reside.; 3. "State within a state"
imperium sine fine	an empire without an end	In Virgil's Aeneid, Jupiter ordered Aeneas to found a city (Rome) from which would come an everlasting, never-ending empire, the endless (sine fine) empire.
impossibilium nulla obligatio est	there is no obligation to do the impossible	Publius Juventius Celsus, Digesta L 17, 185.
imprimatur	let it be printed	An authorization to publish, granted by some censoring authority (originally a Catholic bishop).
in absentia	in the absence	Used in a number of situations, such as in a trial carried out in the absence of the accused.
in absentia lucis, tenebrae vincunt	in the absence of light, darkness prevails	
in actu	in act	In the very act; in reality.
[Dominica] in albis [depositis]	[Sunday in Setting Aside the] White Garments	Latin name of the Octave of Easter.
in articulo mortis	at the point of death	
in bono veritas	truth is in the good	
in camera	in the chamber	In secret. See also camera obscura.
in casu (i.c.)	in the event	In this case.
in cauda venenum	the poison is in the tail	Using the metaphor of a scorpion, this can be said of an account that proceeds gently, but turns vicious towards the end—or more generally waits till the end to reveal an intention or statement that is undesirable in the listener's ears.
in com. Ebor.	In the county of Yorkshire	Abbreviation of in comitatu Eboraci. Eboracum was the Roman name for York and this phrase is used in some Georgian and Victorian books on the genealogy of prominent Yorkshire families.
in Christi lumine pro mundi vita	in the light of Christ for the life on the world	Motto of the Pontifical Catholic University of Chile.
incurvatus in se	turned/curved inward on oneself	
in defensum castitatis	in defence of chastity	Used in reference to the deaths of some Christian martyrs in Catholicism
in Deo speramus	in God we hope	Motto of Brown University.
in dubio pro reo	in doubt, on behalf of the [alleged] culprit	Expresses the judicial principle that in case of doubt the decision must be in favor of the accused (in that anyone is innocent until there is proof to the contrary).
in duplo	in double	In duplicate
in effigie	in the likeness	In (the form of) an image; in effigy (as opposed to "in the flesh" or "in person").
in esse	in existence	In actual existence; as opposed to in posse.
in extenso	in the extended	In full; at full length; complete or unabridged
in extremis	in the furthest reaches	At the very end. In extremity; in dire straits; also "at the point of death" (cf. in articulo mortis).
in facie	in the face	Refers to contempt of court committed in open court in front of the judge; contrast ex facie.
in fide scientiam	To our faith add knowledge	Motto of Newington College.
in fidem	into faith	To the verification of faith.
in fieri	in becoming	In progress; pending.
in fine (i.f.)	in the end	At the end. Used in footnotes, for example, "p. 157 in fine": "the end of page 157".
in flagrante delicto	in a blazing wrong, while the crime is blazing	Caught in the act (esp. a crime or in a "compromising position"); equivalent to "caught red-handed" in English idiom.
in flore	in blossom	Blooming.
in foro	in forum	In court (legal term).
in forma pauperis	in the character or manner of a pauper	
in girum imus nocte et consumimur igni	We enter the circle at night and are consumed by fire	A palindrome said to describe the behavior of moths. Also the title of a film by Guy Debord.
in harmonia progressio	progress in harmony	Motto of Bandung Institute of Technology, Indonesia.
in hoc sensu, or in sensu hoc (s.h.)	in this sense	Recent academic abbreviation for "in this sense".
in hoc signo vinces	by this sign you will conquer	Words which Constantine the Great claimed to have seen in a vision before the Battle of the Milvian Bridge.
in hunc effectum	for this purpose	Describes a meeting called for a particular stated purpose only.
in ictu oculi	in the blink of an eye	
in illo ordine (i.o.)	in that order	Recent academic substitution for the spacious and inconvenient "..., respectively".
in illo tempore	in that time	At that time, or in those days, often used at the start of a liturgical scripture reading to mark an undetermined time in the past or to replace contextual material which is not being read.
in inceptum finis est	lit.: in the beginning is the end	or: the beginning foreshadows the end
in limine	at the outset/threshold	Preliminary, in law, a motion in limine is a motion that is made to the judge before or during trial, often about the admissibility of evidence believed prejudicial.
in loco	in the place, on the spot	That is, 'on site', e.g. "The nearby labs were closed for the weekend, so the water samples were analyzed in loco."
in loco parentis	in the place of a parent	Assuming parental or custodial responsibility and authority (e.g., schoolteachers over students); a legal term.
in luce Tua videmus lucem	in Thy light we see light	Motto of Valparaiso University. The phrase comes from Psalm 36:9: "For with you is the fountain of life; in your light we see light."
in lumine tuo videbimus lumen	in your light we will see the light	Motto of Columbia University New York City, Presbyterian Boys' Senior High School Ghana, Ohio Wesleyan University, University of Fort Hare South Africa
in manus tuas commendo spiritum meum	into your hands I entrust my spirit	According to Luke 23:46, the last words of Jesus on the cross
in medias res	into the middle of things	From Horace. Refers to the literary technique of beginning a narrative in the middle of, or at a late point in, the story, after much action has already taken place. Examples include the Iliad, the Odyssey, Os Lusíadas, Othello, and Paradise Lost. Compare ab initio.
in memoriam	into the memory	Equivalent to "in the memory of". Refers to remembering or honoring a deceased person.
in natura	in nature	
in necessariis unitas, in dubiis libertas, in omnibus caritas	in necessary things unity, in doubtful things liberty, in all things charity	"Charity" (caritas) is being used in the classical sense of "compassion" (cf. agape). Motto of the Cartellverband der katholischen deutschen Studentenverbindungen. Often misattributed to Augustine of Hippo.
in nocte consilium	advice comes in the night; "sleep on it"	Motto of Birkbeck College, University of London, an evening higher-education institution
in nomine diaboli	in the name of the devil	
in nomine Domini	in the name of the Lord	Motto of Trinity College, Perth, Australia; the name of a 1050 papal bull
in nomine patris, et filii, et spiritus sancti	in the name of the Father, and of the Son, and of the Holy Spirit	Invocation of the Holy Trinity; part of the Latin Mass
in nuce	in a nut	in a nutshell; briefly stated; potential; in the embryonic phase
in odium fidei	in hatred of the faith	Used in reference to the deaths of some Christian martyrs in Catholicism
in omnia paratus	ready for anything	Motto of the United States Army's 18th Infantry Regiment
in omnibus amare et servire Domino	in everything, love and serve the Lord	The motto of Ateneo de Iloilo, a school in the Philippines
in omnibus requiem quaesivi, et nusquam inveni nisi in angulo cum libro	Everywhere I have searched for peace and nowhere found it, except in a corner with a book	Quote by Thomas à Kempis
in ovo	in the egg	An experiment or process performed in an egg or embryo (e.g. in ovo electroporation of chicken embryo).
in pace ut sapiens aptarit idonea bello	in peace, like the wise man, make preparations for war	Horace, Satires 2/2:111; similar to si vis pacem, para bellum and igitur qui desiderat pacem, praeparet bellum.
in pace requiescat	in peace may he rest	Alternate form of requiescat in pace ("let him rest in peace"). Found in this form at the end of The Cask of Amontillado by Edgar Allan Poe.
in pari materia	upon the same matter or subject	In statutory interpretation, when a statute is ambiguous, its meaning may be determined in light of other statutes on the same subject matter.
in pari delicto	in equal fault	
in partibus infidelium	in the parts of the infidels	"In the land of the infidels"; used to refer to bishoprics that remain as titular sees even after the corresponding territory was conquered, usually by Muslim rulers.
in pectore	in the heart	A cardinal named in secret by the pope. See also ab imo pectore.
In persona episcopi	in the person of the bishop	Form of Catholic diocesan union where one bishop administers several dioceses while they remain canonically distinct.
in personam	against a person	Directed towards a particular person
in posse	in potential	In the state of being possible; as opposed to in esse.
in propria persona	in one's own person	For one's self, for the sake of one's personhood; acting on one's own behalf, especially a person representing themselves in a legal proceeding; abbreviated pro per. See also pro se: litigant in person, pro se legal representation in the United States.
in principio erat Verbum	in the beginning was the Word (Logos)	Beginning of the Gospel of John
in re	in the matter [of]	Legal term used to indicate that a judicial proceeding may not have formally designated adverse parties or is otherwise uncontested. The term is commonly used in case citations of probate proceedings, for example, In re Smith's Estate; it is also used in juvenile courts, as, for instance, In re Gault.
in rebus	in the thing [itself]	Primarily of philosophical use to discuss properties and property exemplification. In philosophy of mathematics, it is typically contrasted with "ante rem" and, more recently, "post res" structuralism. Sometimes in re is used in place of in rebus.
in regione caecorum rex est luscus	In the land of the blind, the one-eyed man is king.	Quote of Desiderius Erasmus from Adagia (first published 1500, with numerous expanded editions through 1536), III, IV, 96.
in rem	against the thing	Legal term indicating a court's jurisdiction over a piece of property rather than a legal person; contrast with personal (ad personam) jurisdiction. See In rem jurisdiction; Quasi in rem jurisdiction
in rerum natura	in the nature of things	See also Lucretius' De rerum natura (On the Nature of Things).
in retentis	among things held back	Used to describe documents kept separately from the regular records of a court for special reasons.
in saecula (saeculorum), in saeculum saeculi	roughly: down to the times of the times	forever (and ever); liturgical
in saeculo	in the times	In the secular world, esp. outside a monastery, or before death.
in salvo	in safety	
in scientia et virtue	in knowledge and virtue	Motto of St. Joseph's College, Colombo, Colombo. Sri Lanka
in se magna ruunt	great things collapse of their own weight	Lucan, Pharsalia 1:81
in silvam non ligna feras	Do not carry wood to the forest	Horace, Satires 1:10
in situ	in the place	In the original place, appropriate position, or natural arrangement.
in somnis veritas	In dreams there is truth	
in spe	in hope	"future" ("my mother-in-law in spe", i.e. "my future mother-in-law"), or "in embryonic form", as in "Locke's theory of government resembles, in spe, Montesquieu's theory of the separation of powers."
in specialibus generalia quaerimus	To seek the general in the specifics	That is, to understand the most general rules through the most detailed analysis.
in statu nascendi	in the state of being born	Just as something is about to begin
in theatro ludus	like a scene in a play	Surreal
in toto	in all	Totally; entirely; completely.
in triplo	in triple	In triplicate.
in umbra, igitur, pugnabimus	Then we will fight in the shade	Laconic phrase supposedly given by the Spartans in response to the Persian boast at the Battle of Thermopylae that their arrows would obscure the sun. The response, though not in this form, was variously attributed to the soldier Dienekes or to King Leonidas I.
in utero	in the womb	
in utrumque paratus	prepared for either (event)	
in vacuo	in a void	In a vacuum; isolated from other things.
in varietate concordia	united in diversity	The motto of the European Union
in verbo tuo	at your word	a reference to the response of Peter when he was invited by Jesus to "Put out into the deep and let down your nets for a catch" (Luke 5:4–5).
invidiae prudentia victrix	prudence conquers jealousy	
in vino veritas	in wine [there is] truth	That is, wine loosens the tongue (referring to alcohol's disinhibitory effects).
in vitro	in glass	An experimental or process methodology performed in a "non-natural" setting (e.g. in a laboratory using a glass test tube or Petri dish), and thus outside of a living organism or cell. Alternative experimental or process methodologies include in vitro, ex vivo and in vivo.
in vivo	in life/in a living thing	An experiment or process performed on a living specimen.
in vivo veritas	in a living thing [there is] truth	An expression used by biologists to express the fact that laboratory findings from testing an organism in vitro are not always reflected when applied to an organism in vivo. Pun on in vino veritas.
incepto ne desistam	May I not shrink from my purpose!	Motto of Westville Boys' High School and Westville Girls' High School, from Virgil, Aeneid, Book 1. Used by Juno, queen of heaven, who hated the Trojans led by Aeneas. When she saw the fleet of Aeneas on its way to Italy, after the sack of Troy by the Greeks, she planned to scatter it by means of strong winds. In her determination to accomplish her task she cried out "Incepto ne desistam!"
incertae sedis	of uncertain position (seat)	Term used to classify a taxonomic group when its broader relationships are unknown or undefined.
incredibile dictu	incredible to say	Variant on mirabile dictu.
intus et in cute	inwardly and in the skin	Intimately, without reservation. Persius, Satire 3:30.
Index Librorum Prohibitorum	Index of prohibited (or, forbidden) books	List of books considered heretical by the Roman Catholic Church.
indigens Deo	being in need of God, beggar before God	From Augustine, De Civitate Dei XII, 1.3: beatitudinem consequatur nec expleat indigentiam suam, "since it is not satisfied unless it be perfectly blessed".
indignor quandoque bonus dormitat Homerus	I too am annoyed whenever good Homer falls asleep	Horace, Ars Poetica 358
indivisibiliter ac inseparabiliter	indivisible and inseparable	Motto of Austria-Hungary before it was divided and separated into independent states in 1918.
infinitus est numerus stultorum	unending is the number of fools	
infirma mundi elegit Deus	God chooses the weak of the world	The motto of Venerable Vital-Justin Grandin, the bishop of the St. Albert Diocese, which is now the Roman Catholic Archdiocese of Edmonton
infra dignitatem (infra dig)	beneath (one's) dignity	
ingenio stat sine morte decus	the honors of genius are eternal	Propertius, Elegies Book III, 2
initium sapientiae timor Domini	the fear of the Lord is the beginning of wisdom	Psalm 111:10. Motto of the University of Aberdeen, Scotland.
iniuriae qui addideris contumeliam	you who have added insult to injury	Phaedrus, Fables 5/3:5.
inopiae desunt multa, avaritiae omnia	to poverty many things are lacking; to avarice, everything	Publilius Syrus.
insita hominibus libidine alendi de industria rumores	men have an innate desire to propagate rumors or reports	Titus Livius (XXVII, XXIV); Michel de Montaigne, Essays.
instante mense (inst.)	in the present month	Used in formal correspondence to refer to the current month, sometimes abbreviated as inst; e.g.: "Thank you for your letter of the 17th inst."—ult. mense = last month, prox. mense = next month.
Instrumentum regni	instrument of government	Used to express the exploitation of religion by State or ecclesiastical polity as a means of controlling the masses, or in particular to achieve political and mundane ends.
Instrumentum vocale	instrument with voice	So Varro in his De re rustica (On Agriculture) defines the slave: an instrument (as a simple plow, or etc.) with voice.
intaminatis fulget honoribus	untarnished, she shines with honor	From Horace's Odes (III.2.18). Motto of Wofford College.
integer vitae scelerisque purus	unimpaired by life and clean of wickedness	From Horace's Odes (I.22.1) Used as a funeral hymn.
intelligenti pauca	few words suffice for him who understands	
inter alia (i.a.)	among other things	
inter alios	among other persons	
inter arma enim silent leges	in a time of war, the law falls silent	Said by Cicero in Pro Milone as a protest against unchecked political mobs that had virtually seized control of Rome in the 60s and 50s BC. Famously quoted in the essay Civil Disobedience by Henry David Thoreau as "The clatter of arms drowns out the voice of the law". This phrase has also been jokingly translated as "In a time of arms, the legs are silent."
inter caetera	among other (works)	title of a 1493 papal bull
inter mutanda constantia	steadfast in the midst of change	Motto of Rockwell College in Ireland and Francis Libermann Catholic High School in Ontario, Canada
inter spem et metum	between hope and fear	
inter faeces et urinam nascimur	we are born between feces and urine	Attributed to Saint Augustine.
inter sacrum saxumque	between the sacrifice and the stone	Being in a dilemma. From Plautus, Captivi, listed in Adagia by Erasmus. See also: "between a rock and a hard place", "between the devil and the deep blue sea".
inter vivos	between the living	Describes property transfers between living persons, as opposed to a testamentary transfer upon death such as an inheritance; often relevant to tax laws.
interna praestant	what is inside is better	or, virtue/character above all; see: prestant interna (coronae)
intra muros	within the walls	Not public; source of the word intramural. Can also refer to the portion of a city within the city walls (current or past); for example, Intramuros, Manila.
intra vires	within the powers	Within one's authority. Contrasted with ultra vires.
invenias etiam disiecti membra poetae	you would still recognize the scattered fragments of a poet	Horace, Satires, I, 4, 62, in reference to the earlier Roman poet Ennius.
inveniet quod quisque velit	each shall find what he desires	Attributed to Petronius or Prudentius. Motto of the journal Nature in Cambridgeshire: Inveniet quod quisque velit; non omnibus unum est, quod placet; hic spinas colligit, ille rosas ("Each shall find what he desires; no one thing pleases all; one gathers thorns, another roses").
invicta	unconquered	Motto of the English county of Kent and the city of Porto
invictus maneo	I remain unvanquished	Motto of the Armstrong clan
Iohannes est nomen eius	John is his name	Luke 1:63, referring to John the Baptist. Motto of the coat of arms of Puerto Rico.
ipsa scientia potestas est	knowledge itself is power	Famous phrase written by Sir Francis Bacon in 1597
ipse dixit	he himself said it	Commonly said in Medieval debates and referring to Aristotle. Used in general to emphasize that some assertion comes from some authority, i.e., as an argument from authority, and the term ipse-dixitism has come to mean any unsupported rhetorical assertion that lacks a logical argument. Literal translation by Cicero (in his De Natura Deorum 1.10) of the Greek αὐτὸς ἔφα, an invocation by Pythagoreans when appealing to the pronouncements of the master.
ipsissima verba	the very words themselves	"Strictly word for word" (cf. verbatim). Often used in Biblical Studies to describe the record of Jesus' teaching found in the New Testament (specifically, the four Gospels).
ipsissima voce	in the very voice itself	To approximate the main thrust or message without using the exact words
ipso facto	by the fact itself	By that very fact
ipso jure	by the law itself	Automatically as a consequence of law
ira deorum	wrath of the gods	Like the vast majority of inhabitants of the ancient world, the ancient Romans practiced pagan rituals, believing it important to achieve a state of pax deorum (peace of the gods) instead of ira deorum (wrath of the gods): earthquakes, floods, famine, etc.
ira furor brevis est	wrath (anger) is but a brief madness	
ita vero	thus indeed	Useful phrase, as the Romans had no word for "yes", preferring to respond to questions with the affirmative or negative of the question (e.g., "Are you hungry?" was answered by "I am hungry" or "I am not hungry", not "yes" or "no").
ite, missa est	go, it is the dismissal	Loosely: "You have been dismissed". Concluding words addressed to the people in the Mass of the Roman Rite. The term missa "Mass" derives from a reanalysis of the phrase to mean "Go, the missa is accomplished."
iter legis	the path of the law	The path a law takes from its conception to its implementation
iucunda memoria est praeteritorum malorum	pleasant is the memory of past troubles	Cicero, De finibus bonorum et malorum 2, 32, 105
iugulare mortuos	to cut the throat of corpses	From Gerhard Gerhards' (1466–1536) (better known as Erasmus) collection of annotated Adagia (1508). It can mean attacking the work or personality of deceased person. Alternatively, it can be used to describe criticism of an individual already heavily criticised by others.
iuncta iuvant	together they strive	also spelled juncta juvant; from the legal principle quae non valeant singula, iuncta iuvant ("What is without value on its own, helps when joined")
iura novit curia	the court knows the law	Legal principle in civil law countries of the Roman-German tradition that says that lawyers need not argue the law, as that is the office of the court. Sometimes miswritten as iura novat curia (the court renews the laws).
iure matris	in right of his mother	Indicates a right exercised by a son on behalf of his mother
iure uxoris	in right of his wife	Indicates a right exercised by a husband on behalf of his wife
iuris ignorantia est cum ius nostrum ignoramus	it is ignorance of the law when we do not know our own rights	
ius accrescendi	right of accrual	Commonly referred to as "right of survivorship": a rule in property law that surviving joint tenants have rights in equal shares to a decedent's property
ius ad bellum	law towards war	Refers to the laws that regulate the reasons for going to war. Typically, this would address issues of self-defense or preemptive strikes.
ius cogens	compelling law	A peremptory norm, a fundamental principle of international law considered to have acceptance among the international community of states as a whole and from which no derogation is permitted.
ius est ars boni et aequi	the law is the art of goodness and equity	Appears on the front of the Sievekingplatz 2, a courthouse of the Hanseatisches Oberlandesgericht, in Hamburg, Germany.
ius in bello	law in war	Refers to the "laws" that regulate the conduct of combatants during a conflict. Typically, this would address issues of who or what is a valid target, how to treat prisoners, and what sorts of weapons can be used.
ius primae noctis	law of the first night	The droit du seigneur, supposed right of a lord to have sexual relations with a newly married female subject
jus sanguinis	right of blood	A legal doctrine granting citizenship based on the nationality of one's parents
jus soli	right of the soil	A legal doctrine granting birthright citizenship
iustam causam deus non derelinqvet	god will not abandon the just cause	Appears on Francis II Rákóczi's flag.
iustitia dilata est iustitia negata	justice delayed is justice denied	
iustitia fundamentum regni	justice is the foundation of a reign	Motto of the Supreme Public Prosecutor's Office of the Czech Republic.
iustitia nemini neganda est	justice is to be denied to nobody	
iustitia non est neganda, non differenda	justice is not to be denied, not to be delayed	
iustitia omnibus	justice for all	The motto of Washington, D.C.
iuventuti nil arduum	to the young nothing is difficult	Motto of Canberra Girls Grammar School
iuventutis veho fortunas	I bear the fortunes of youth	Motto of Dollar Academy
