= The Strength of the Few =

Epic fantasy novel by James Islington

- Author: James Islington
- Series: The Hierarchy
- Release number: 2
- Genre: Epic fantasy
- Publisher: Gallery / Saga Press
- Publication date: 11 November 2025
- Pages: 720
- ISBN: 1982141239
- Preceded by: The Will of the Many
- Followed by: The Justice of One

The Strength of the Few is an epic fantasy novel by Australian author James Islington. Published in 2025 by Gallery / Saga Press, it is the second installment in The Hierarchy series, following The Will of the Many (2023).

== Background and publication ==
The novel continues the story and world introduced in The Will of the Many, expanding on the political, metaphysical, and historical implications of the Hierarchy’s system of power based on the extraction and accumulation of Will. Islington announced the title and publication timeline after the release and commercial success of the first volume.

The Strength of the Few was released in hardcover, ebook, and audiobook formats on 11 November 2025.

== Premise ==
Set in the aftermath of the events of The Will of the Many, the novel follows Vis Telimus as the consequences of the Academy trials and the revelations surrounding the ancient labyrinths begin to reshape the balance of power within the Catenan Republic. As internal factions maneuver for control and long-suppressed forces move closer to open conflict, Vis is drawn deeper into the true nature of Synchronism and the legacy of the Cataclysm.

The narrative further explores the competing realms hinted at in the first novel, as well as the moral and political costs of a society built on compulsory submission and concentrated power.

== Plot ==
Following the events of The Will of the Many, three versions of Vis find themselves in three separate worlds. In Res, the world in which the events of the first book were set, Vis struggles with an increasingly contentious political struggle between Military, Governance, and Religion. In Luceum, Vis takes on the name of Deaglán. Unaware that he has been copied into a separate world, but pleasantly surprised that the Hierarchy is unknown to the people he meets, he finds a sense of family and community. In Obiteum, Vis encounters Ulcisor's brother Caeror, who explains that Vis has been copied into three worlds.

== Main characters ==
=== Res ===
- Vis Telimus Catenicus – Former prince of Suus, in hiding until he was adopted by Ulciscor Telimus. Now a Sextus in Governance after winning the Iudicium competition in The Will of the Many
- Eidhin Breac – Sextus in Military, friend of Vis and his ally in finding out who was behind the events at the Iudicium
- Aequa Claudius – Quintus in Governance, survivor of the naumachia, friend of Vis and his ally in finding out who was behind the events at the Iudicium
- Emissa Corenius – Sextus in Military, love interest to Vis before the events of the Iudicium
- Ulciscor Telimus – Magnus Quintus and Military senator. Adoptive father of Vis Telimus and consumed with finding out what really happened to his brother, Caeror.
- Lanistia Scipio – Sextus residing in Ulciscor's family estate. Tutor to Vis. Former classmate of the deceased Caeror Telimus.
- Relucia Telimus – Sextus, wife of Ulciscor, secretly a member of the Anguis rebel group resisting the Hierarchy.
- Veridius Julii – The Principalis, in charge of the Academy, Quintus in Religion
- Kadmos – Septimus in Military, Dispensator to the Telimus family and tutor to Vis.
- Livia Ericius – Septimus in Governance, sister to the deceased Callidus
- Ericius – Magnus Tertius in Governance, father to Callidus and Livia, supervisor to Vis
- Indol Quiscil – Sextus in Religion, friend of Vis and his ally in finding out who was behind the events at the Iudicium
- Amercus Decimus – Tertius in Religion, father of Iro, embittered toward Vis for his daughter's death at the naumachia
- Ostius – A mysterious ally of the Anguis, who can travel between Res and Luceum
- Cristoval – Former king of Suus, Vis' father, executed by the Hierarchy five years before the events of The Strength of the Few

=== Luceum ===
- Deaglán also known as Leathfhear – Vis' identity in Luceum after passing through the Gate between the worlds in The Will of the Many
- Tara – A student at Loch Traenala, daughter of King Rónán
- Gallchobhar – Champion of King Rónán
- Lir – A druid assigned to King Rónán
- Conor – A student at Loch Traenala
- Fearghus – A student at Loch Traenala
- Seanna – A student at Loch Traenala
- Miach – A student at Loch Traenala
- Grainne – A woman who takes in Vis after his arrival in Luceum
- Cian – A druid who assists Vis after he arrives in Luceum
- Pádraig – Instructor at Loch Traenala
- Ruarc – A mysterious druid who some believe is exerting undue influence over the Grove and who appears to want Vis dead

=== Obiteum ===
- Siamun – Vis' identity in Obiteum after passing through the Gate between the worlds in The Will of the Many
- Caeror Telimus – Brother of Ulciscor, has been surviving in Obiteum since passing through the Gate seven years previously
- Ahmose – A iunctus and ally of Vis in Duat
- Netiqret – An assassin who assists Vis in Duat
- Kiya – A child iunctus who appears to obey Netiqret
- Nofret – A child living in Qabr
- Tash – A iunctus in Qabr
- Ka – The man in control of Duat who Caeror believes will cause the next Cataclysm

== Audiobook ==
The audiobook edition of the book, narrated by Euan Morton, reached #1 on Audible's bestseller lists in three categories on its release day, 11 November 2025: Historical Fantasy, Action & Adventure Fantasy, and Epic Fantasy. That same month, Sony Pictures purchased the rights to adapt the series to film. In May 2026, six months to the day after its release, the audiobook still held the #1 position on Amazon's Historical Fantasy bestseller list, with its predecessor The Will of the Many at #2. As of September 2026, ten months after release, both audiobooks continued to hold the top two positions on the same list, with The Will of the Many at #1 and The Strength of the Few at #2.
