= The Light of All That Falls =

2019 fantasy novel by James Islington

- Author: James Islington
- Language: English
- Series: The Licanius Trilogy
- Release number: 3
- Publisher: Orbit Books
- Publication date: 10 December 2019
- Pages: 864
- Preceded by: An Echo of Things to Come

The Light of All That Falls is a 2019 epic fantasy novel by James Islington. It is the conclusion to The Licanius Trilogy. It was preceded by The Shadow of What Was Lost and An Echo of Things to Come. The novel received mixed critical reviews.

== Plot ==
=== Prologue ===
Thousands of years ago, Aarkein Devaed destroyed the Shining Lands, inhabited by the Darecians. This was done so that the surviving Darecians would one day create the city of Deilannis, and with it a time-traveling device. Shammaeloth, a demon, hopes to use the device to bring the Darklands into Andarra. The Venerate believe that Shammaeloth is their god, El. They believe that when “El” reaches Deilannis, they will be able to change the past and undo all of the crimes that they have committed in El’s name. Realizing that this was a lie, Devaed switched sides and created the Boundary to keep Shammaeloth away from Deilannis. Deilannis is destroyed, and the last survivors become the Lyth. Caeden plans to close the Rift to the Darklands and ensure that the two realms remain separate forever. To do so, he must kill all Augurs and all of the Venerate, including himself. The Venerate can only be killed by Licanius, which is currently being held north of the Boundary.

=== Main story ===
Davian remains imprisoned north of the Boundary. He is transported to Zvaelar, a city that exists outside of time. Davian meets Tal’kamar/Caeden there. (Due to time travel, this version of Tal’kamar has not yet experienced some of the events that Davian remembers). While there, he meets people who are being kept prisoner and forced to work for the Venerate, including a philosopher named Raeleth and a Gifted named Niha. Eventually, Davian helps Tal’kamar, Raeleth, and Niha escape from Zvaelar; they all return to their original place on the timeline.

With help from Caeden and the Lyth, Asha escapes from her Tributary without shutting down the Boundary. Wirr learns of a prophecy that Ilin Illan will soon be destroyed. Wirr’s uncle, King Andras, is killed when monsters attack the city. Caeden defeats the monsters and destroys Ilin Illan in the process. Wirr, Asha, and Caeden fight back against an invasion from Desriel, a neighboring country. Caeden retrieves Licanius from Shammaeloth and kills Nethgalla, after finding out she killed and impersonated Karaliene. He is stabbed by Licanius; he does not die, but his life expectancy is severely limited by the wound.

The Boundary is destroyed by the Venerate and Desriel’s army. Caeden kills the remaining Venerate, and all of the Augurs except Davian are killed in various battles. Asha, Davian, and Caeden head to Deilannis, hoping to seal the Rift before Shammaeloth arrives. Caeden uses a Vessel to destroy Davian’s Augur powers, then enters the Rift to go back in time. The Rift closes.

Caeden visits various points on the timeline. He meets Niha and her infant son. He realizes that she and Raeleth are Davian’s parents, and arranges for Davian to be placed at the school in Caladel. He says farewell to his deceased wife, Eliavia. Finally, he returns to the past where he assumed that he killed Davian. Caeden shapeshifts into Davian’s form and tries to convince his past self to change sides. Caeden’s past self kills his future self, but Davian is able to continue living in the present with Asha and Wirr, who after Karaliene's death is to be the new ruler of Andarra.

== Reception ==
Kirkus Reviews praised the novel for its "intricate, lavish, and sometimes intimidating detail", but questioned whether or not the plot threads add up and criticized the use of the many immortal characters. Publishers Weekly wrote a more negative review, criticizing the novel's length and complexity and writing that the characters "are not dynamic enough to support the heavy burden of the plot".
