= Saint John the Baptist Catholic School =

Roman Catholic school in Metro Manila, Philippines

St. John the Baptist Catholic School
- Paaralang Katoliko ng San Juan Bautista (Filipino)
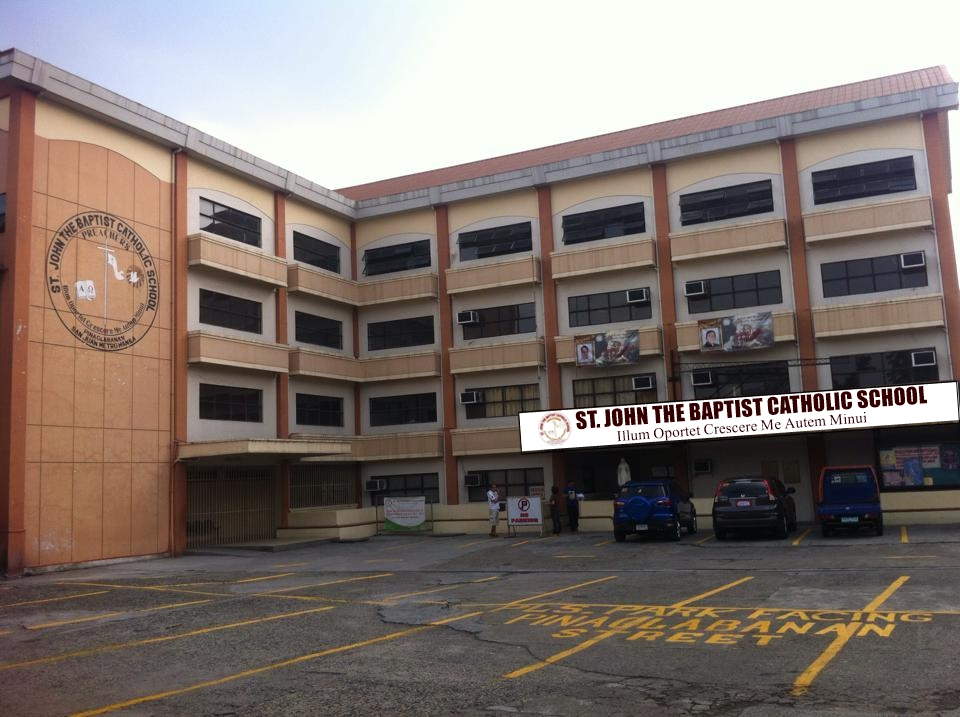
- School facade

Location
- San Juan, Metro Manila; Philippines; 14°36′18″N 121°01′41″E

Information
- Type: Private, Sectarian
- Motto: Illum Oportet Crescere Me Autem Minui "He Must Increase, while I Must Decrease" (John 3:30)
- Established: July 1963
- Director: Maxell Lowell C. Aranilla; John Rany P. Geraldino (Asst. Director)
- Principal: Ms. Maria Lourdes Torres
- Enrollment: approx. 900+
- Campus: Pinaglabanan St. San Juan
- Colors: Brown & Yellow
- Athletics: SAPRISA, MAPSA, City Division of San Juan
- Nickname: SJBCS Preachers
- Newspaper: The Preachers
- Yearbook: Preachers
- Affiliations: St. John the Baptist Parish; MAPSA; RCAM-ES; CEAP
- Former name: Holy Child Parochial School
- Hymn: "St. John The Baptist Hymn"
- Student Coordinating Body Chairman: Vaughn Damon R. Mantolino (SY 2024-2025)
- Website: Facebook

St. John the Baptist Catholic School, formerly Holy Child Parochial School (1963–2005), is a private Catholic school in San Juan, Metro Manila, Philippines. It is owned and administered by the Archdiocese of Manila, under the Manila Archdiocesan and Parochial Schools Association System, run by the St. John the Baptist Parish, the parish priest and the school director.

== History ==
In the municipality of San Juan in the Archdiocese of Manila under the Parish of St. John the Baptist, Pinaglabanan, San Juan, Metro Manila a kindergarten class was started by Stephen Cebreros within the Augustinian Sisters compound along Santolan Rd, SJ. With the opening of the first grade class in July 1963, Mother General Evangelista de San Agustine was able to seek government recognition for their school, Jesus of Prague Kindergarten School and asked the permission of Cardinal Rufino Santos to open the school. Santos responded that he would only approve the opening of a Catholic school if it was to be in the premises of the parish and managed by the sisters, and the parish priest was to be Honorary Director of the school.

In 1973 the Articles of Incorporation of the Holy Child Parochial School of San Juan, Rizal Inc. came out as a duly registered incorporation under the (SEC).

In 1976 the HCPS became a member of MAPSA and CEAP, under the leadership of Protacio Gungon.

In 1979, Alfredo Rodriguez was appointed by Cardinal Jaime L. Sin as parish priest and school director of HCPS, where he remained for almost 21 years. During his incumbency the school outreach programs were initiated and a four-story school building constructed.

On October 1, 2002, Francisco M. Ungria Jr. was appointed parish priest and school director. His responsibilities included the academic and financial running of the school. He was responsible for renovating the school, and the construction of the high school building in the vicinity. The school changed its name from Holy Child Parochial School to St. John the Baptist Catholic School, Inc. at the start of school year 2004–2005. He appointed Nolan Que as principal of the school. On September 26, 2005 the change of name was approved by the Securities and Exchange Commission.

Xavier School, which is also in San Juan, signs a MOA with St. John the Baptist Catholic School.

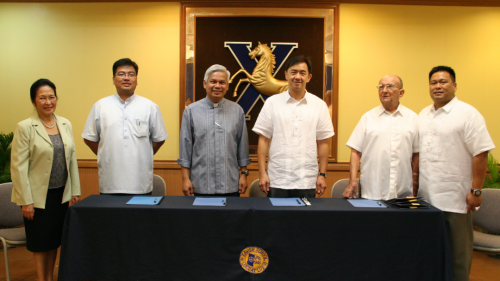
XS signs a MOA with SJBCS

In June 2011, there was a turn-over of principalship from Nolan A. Que to Adolfo T. Paroni Jr. On March 28, 2014, the graduation of the Senior batch 2014, Frank ceased to be the school director pursuant to the decision of Cardinal Luis Antonio G. Tagle that a priest should only have one ministry, continuing to be the parish priest of St. John the Baptist Parish. In response to the needs of the times and in consonance with the RCAM-ES Program, schools are clustered into groups. At present, Saint John the Baptist Catholic School belongs to cluster 7 under the directorship of Maxell Lowell C. Aranilla with Rany P. Geraldino as the assistant director and Maria Lourdes Torres as the principal respectively. The cluster includes six other schools namely: Our Lady of Guadalupe Minor Seminary, Paco Catholic School, St. Pius X Parochial School, St. Joseph's School – Pandacan, Guadalupe Catholic School and San Isidro Catholic School.

In 2015, SJBCS started to adapt the Genyo e-Learning for the SY 2015–2016.

In school year 2016–2017, there was a turnover of principalship from Noel F. Noble to Tanya P. Namit.

In school year 2017–2018, there was a turnover of principalship from Tanya P. Namit to Gilbert D. Gayob

In school year 2023–2024, there was a turnover of principalship from Gilbert D. Gayob to Maria Lourdes Torres

== Curriculum ==
The school adapts the K-12 Curriculum for Kindergarten to Grade 12 Students.

== Notable alumni ==
- Amy Perez-Castillo - Actress, main host of Umagang Kay Ganda and It's Showtime
- Zsa Zsa Padilla - Singer, actress, main host of ASAP
- Jiro Manio - Actor
