= Pinaglabanan Church =

Roman Catholic church in Metro Manila, Philippines

- Archdiocesan Shrine of Saint John the Baptist
- Pang-Arkidiyosesis na Dambana ni San Juan Bautista (Filipino); Santuario Arquidiocesano de San Juan Bautista del Pinaglabanan (Spanish)
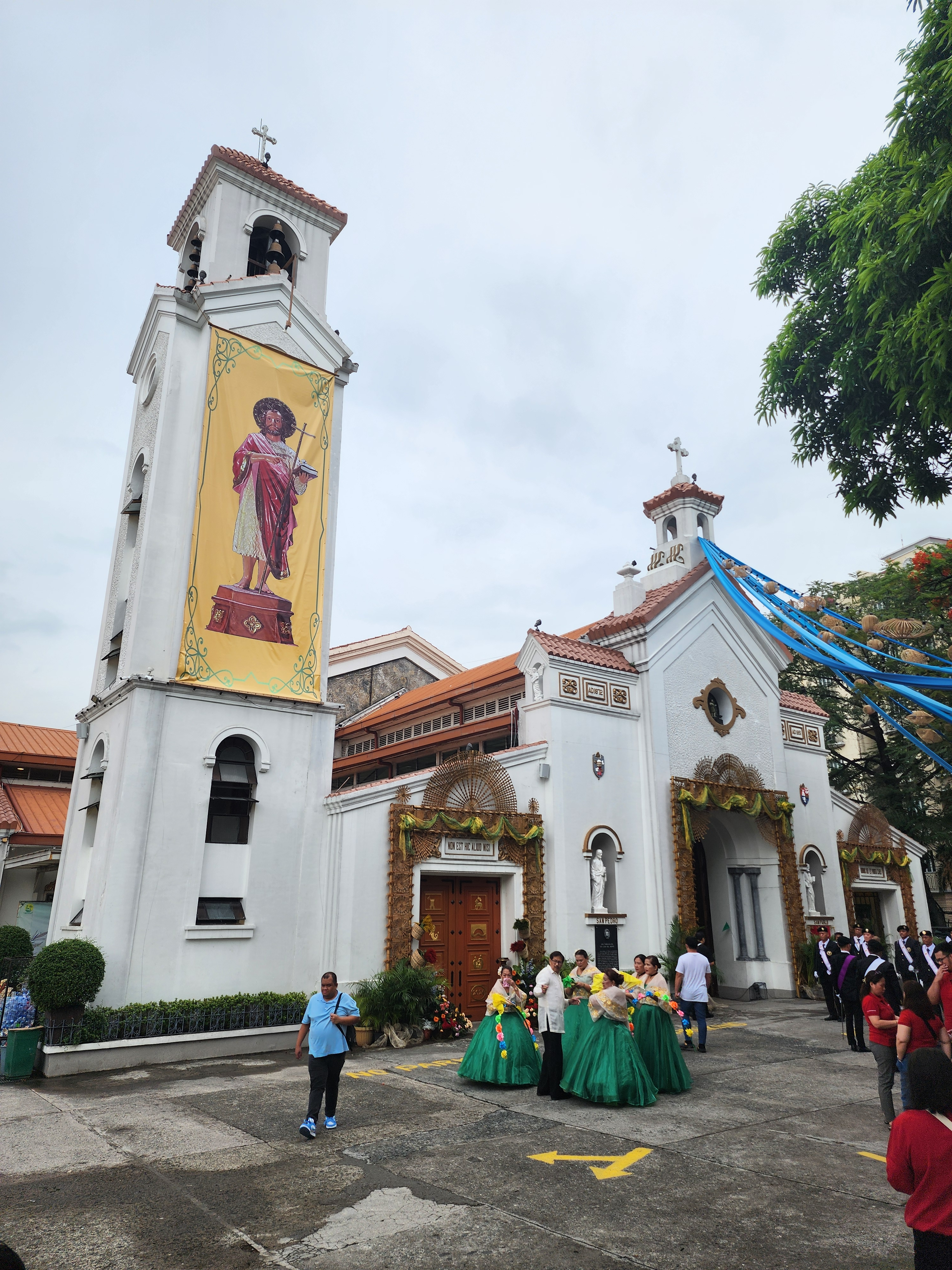
- The church's eastern façade and Centennial Belfry in June 2024
- Pinaglabanan Church
- 14°36′18″N 121°01′41″E
- Location: 140 Pinaglabanan Street, Barangay Pedro Cruz, San Juan, Metro Manila
- Country: Philippines
- Denomination: Roman Catholic

History
- Former name: Saint John the Baptist Church
- Status: Archdiocesan Shrine
- Founded: July 15, 1894
- Founder(s): Rev. Fr. Roman Pérez, OFM
- Dedication: John the Baptist

Architecture
- Functional status: Active
- Heritage designation: Cultural Property
- Designated: 1974
- Architect: Luis Arellano
- Architectural type: Church building
- Style: Neo-Romanesque
- Groundbreaking: 1896

Administration
- Archdiocese: Manila
- Deanery: St. John the Baptist
- Parish: St. John the Baptist

Clergy
- Rector: Michael D. Kalaw
- Vicar: Florencio A. Unida
- Dean: Jerome R. Secillano
- Priest: Rogelio Orpiada

The Archdiocesan Shrine of Saint John the Baptist, known colloquially as Pinaglabanan Church, is a 19th-century Roman Catholic church in San Juan, Metro Manila, Philippines. It belongs to the Archdiocese of Manila.

== Name ==
The church derives its name from John the Baptist, to whom it is dedicated. He is both the patron saint and namesake of the city, which has the ceremonial name of San Juan del Monte (Saint John of the Mountain), owing to the area's hilly terrain.

The edifice is also known colloquially as the "Pinaglabanan Church", as it is several meters from the Pinaglabanan Shrine. The area near the church and shrine received the name "Pinaglabanan" (Tagalog for "battleground") as the Katipunan engaged the Spanish Empire in the Battle of San Juan del Monte, marking the start of the 1896 Philippine Revolution.

== History ==
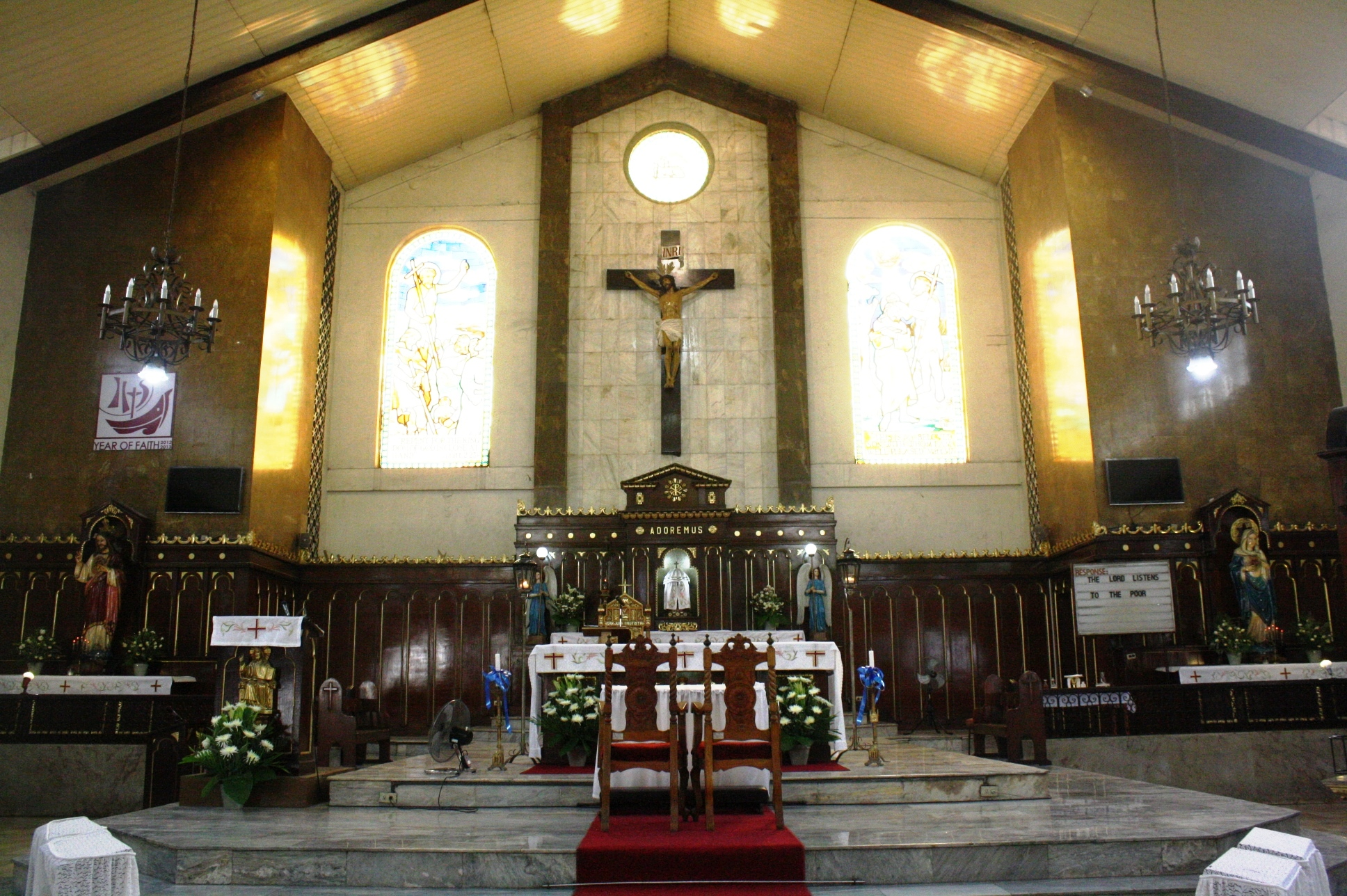
The high altar within the western sanctuary of the church. A freestanding altar stands before it on a platform that extends into the main nave.

=== Establishment ===
Although the parish was established on July 15, 1894, the construction of the first church happened a year after, under the supervision of architect Luis Arellano and the financial support of Mariano Artiaga. A Franciscan, Roman Pérez, served as the first parish priest from 1894 until 1897.

The newly built church then enshrined a centuries-old image of John the Baptist, after whom the then-town is named.

=== Revolution against Spain ===
On August 30, 1896, the Battle of San Juan del Monte between Filipino and Spanish troops occurred on the tract of land fronting the newly built church. The battle, which was one of the first in the Philippine Revolution, is commemorated annually at the shrine and park that stands today at the site.

=== Renovations ===
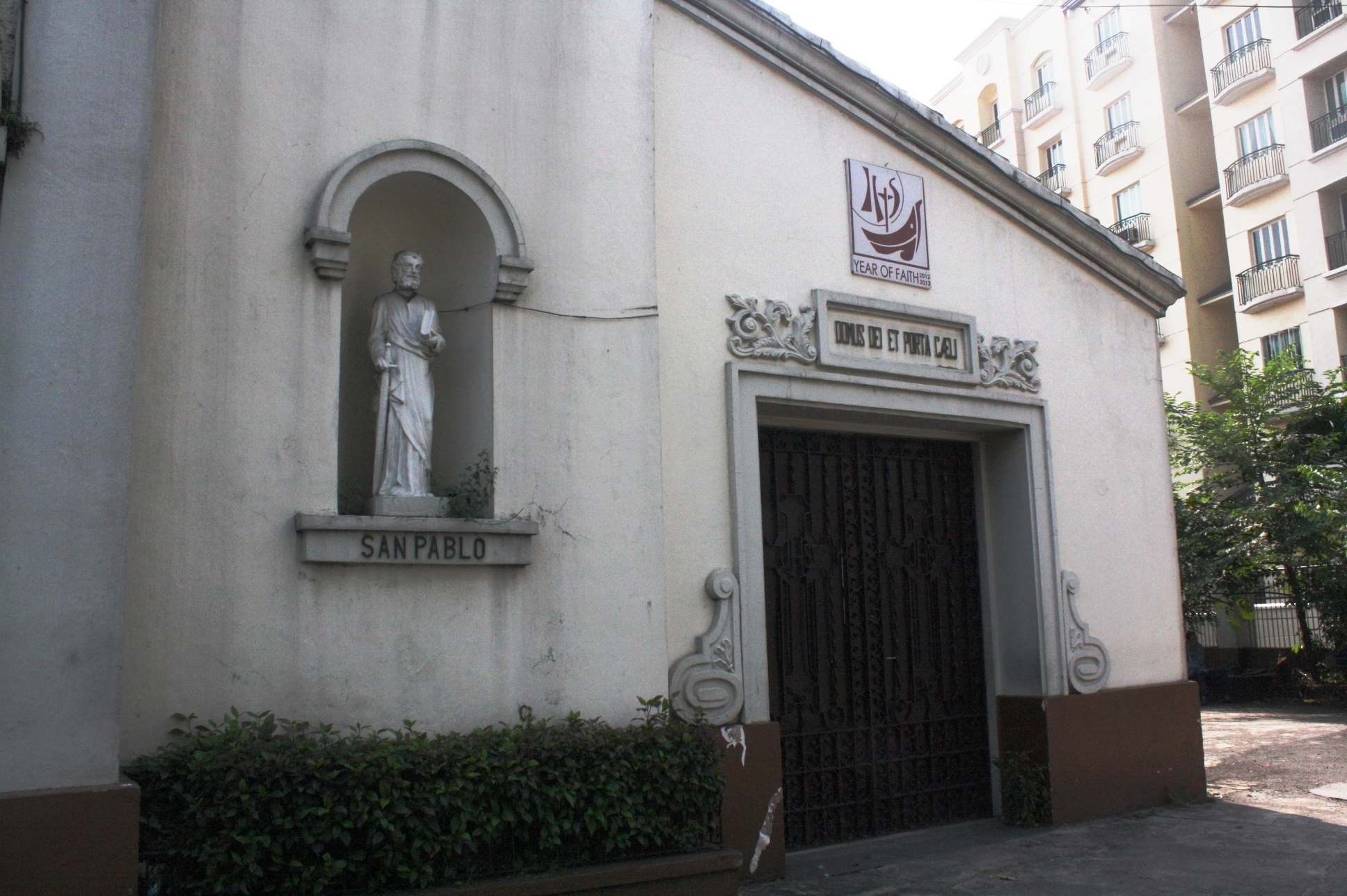
The northern front door of the eastern façade, which was one of two doors added during the expansion in the 1950s

Ramón J. Fernández spearheaded repairs to the church, which was damaged in the Revolution. When Hernando Antiporda (who later became Auxiliary Bishop of Manila) was parish priest in 1951, the church was renovated and expanded under the supervision of architect Otilio A. Arellano, grandson of the original architect, Luis Arellano. The younger Arellano notably preserved the original façade and nave of the structure. With the expansion, the church acquired two additional front doors.

=== Expansion ===
In 1975, Severino Casas built two mortuary chapels in the church compound. Changes in 1983 included the lengthening of the nave and the removal of the choir loft above the main door, as well as the installation of the crucifix above a new altar. The retablo (reredos) was preserved, while the antique image of Saint John the Baptist—which was previously at the top-centre of the retablo—was moved to the Saint Joseph Chapel.

A rectory, social hall, and crypt were built in 1987 on the location of the Our Lady of Lourdes grotto built in 1955. A year later, a Perpetual Adoration Chapel was built, only to be demolished to make way for the Holy Child Parochial School (now the St. John the Baptist Catholic School). A smaller, air-conditioned Adoration Chapel at the ground floor of the school near the church's southern entrance was finished in 2009.

=== Declaration as historical landmark ===
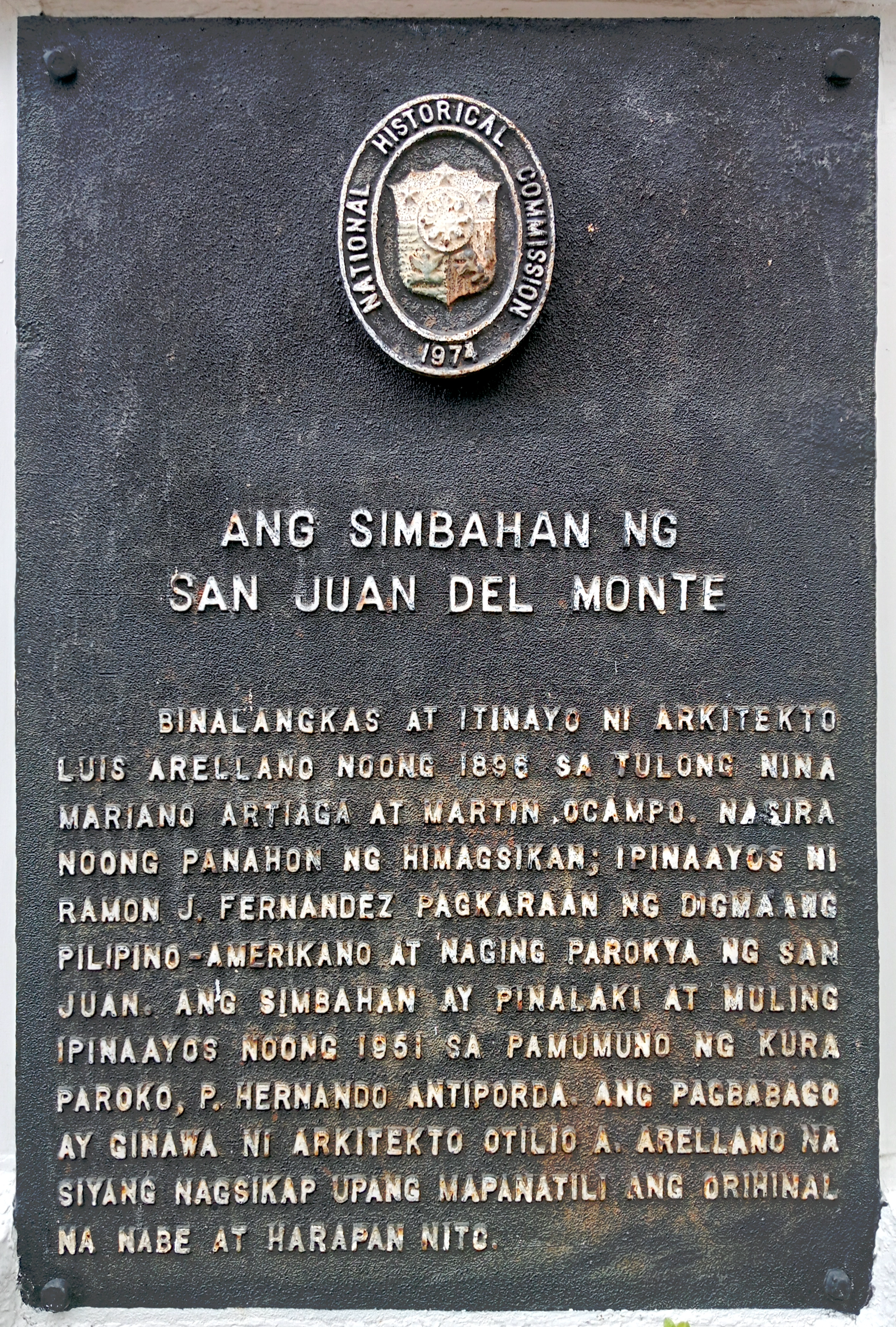
Historical marker installed by the National Historical Commission in 1974 to commemorate the church

The St. John the Baptist Church was declared as a historical landmark through San Juan Municipal Council Resolution, Ordinance No. 63 Series of 1989.

On May 15, 1994, the Feast of the Ascension, Cardinal Jaime Sin, Archbishop of Manila, blessed and inaugurated the new San Juan Centennial Belfry, built to commemorate the church's hundredth anniversary. Architects Renato Berroya and Arsenio Topacio designed the structure, which matches the façade, and houses the church bell that dates to 1896.

=== Archdiocesan Shrine ===
On June 24, 2024, Cardinal Jose Advincula, Archbishop of Manila, bestowed the title of Archdiocesan Shrine to the parish church. The shrine also opened a Holy Door to mark its 130th jubilee year. In the same event, San Juan Mayor Francis Zamora, one of the city government officials in attendance, endorsed to Cardinal Advincula a resolution declaring John the Baptist as the patron saint (de jure) of San Juan City.

== Parish priests ==
| Name | Years serving | Present assignment |
|---|---|---|
| Protacio G. Gungon | 1977–1978 | Bishop-emeritus of Antipolo / deceased |
| Alfredo B. Rodriguez | 1978–2000 | deceased |
| Albert Abiera Venus | 2000–2001 | Parish Priest, Our Lady of Fatima Parish (Pamplona Dos, Las Piñas) |
| Victor Allan B. Dichoso | 2001–2002 | Parish Priest, Our Lady of Fatima Parish (Bangkal, Makati) |
| Francisco M. Ungria Jr. | 2002–2015 | deceased |
| Herbert John B. Camacho (acting) | February–July 2015 | Rector and Parish Priest, Archdiocesan Shrine of Our Lady of Peñafrancia (Paco, Manila) |
| Nestor C. Cerbo | July 1, 2017 – December 2019 | Attached Priest, St. Andrew the Apostle Parish (Bel-Air, Makati) |
| Vicente D. Bauson | 2020–2022 | Attached Priest, Saint John the Baptist Parish Church (San Juan) |
| Michael D. Kalaw | 2022–present | |

== Gallery ==
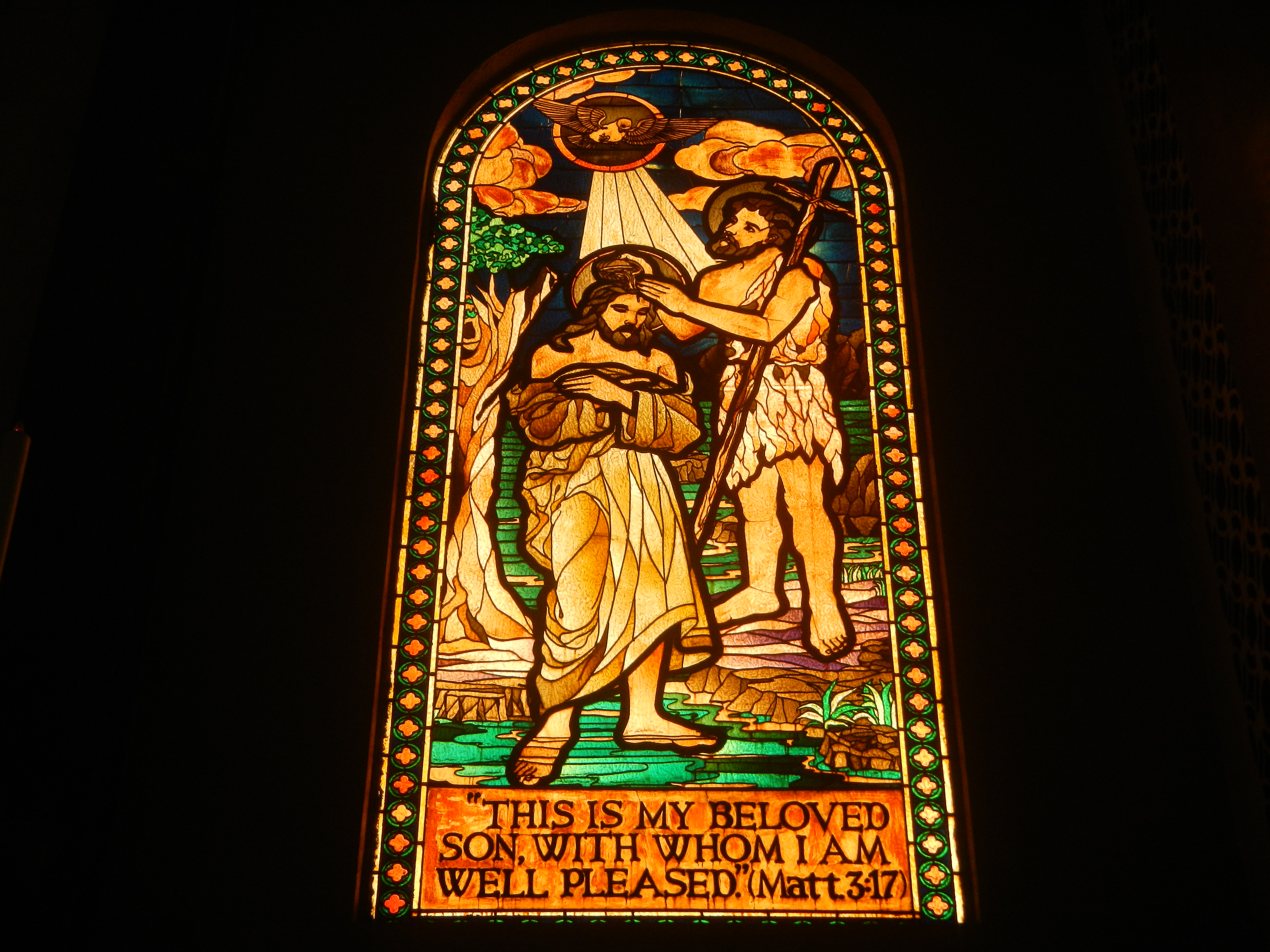
Stained glass window featuring the Baptism of Jesus

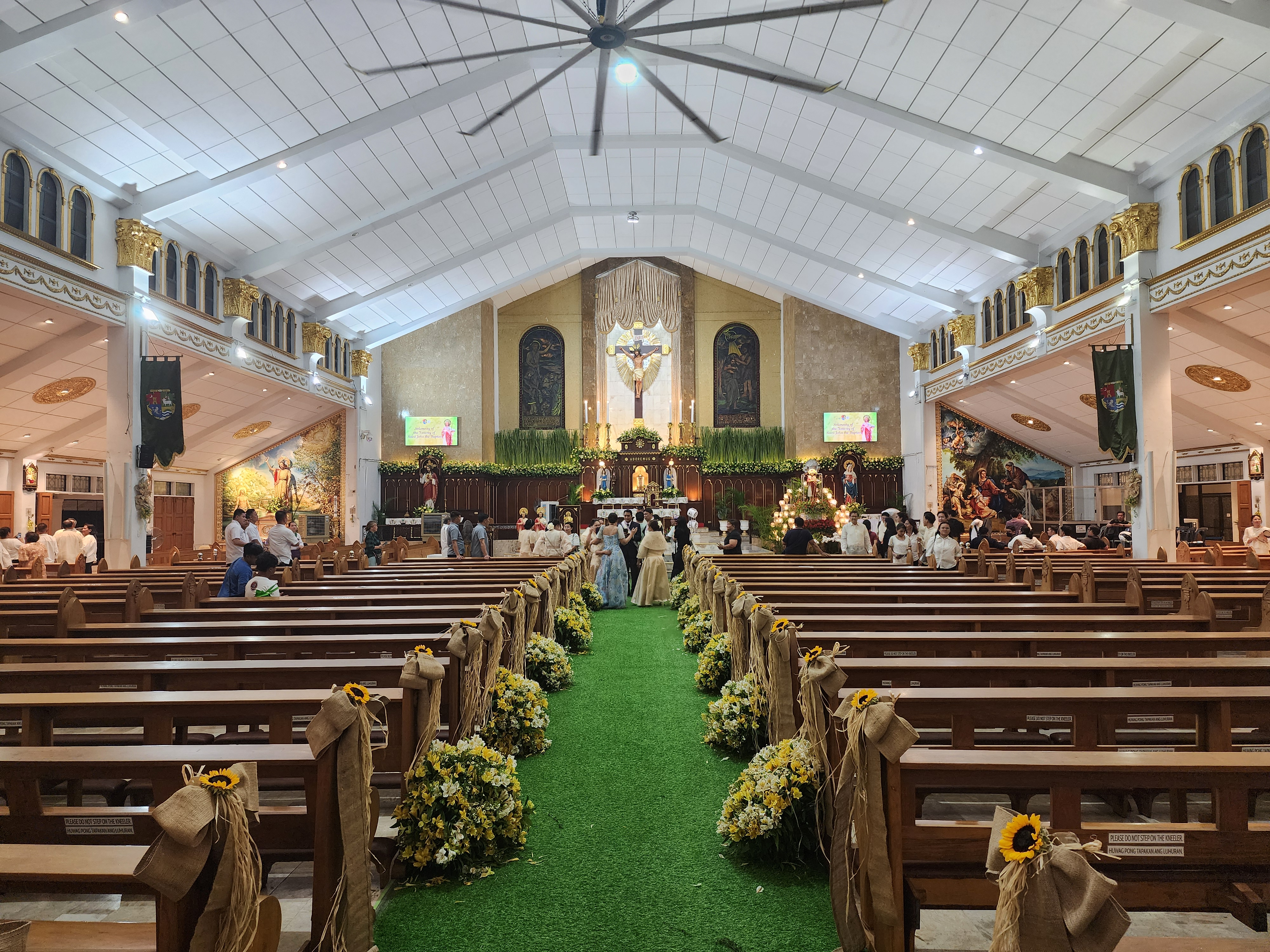
Nave in 2024

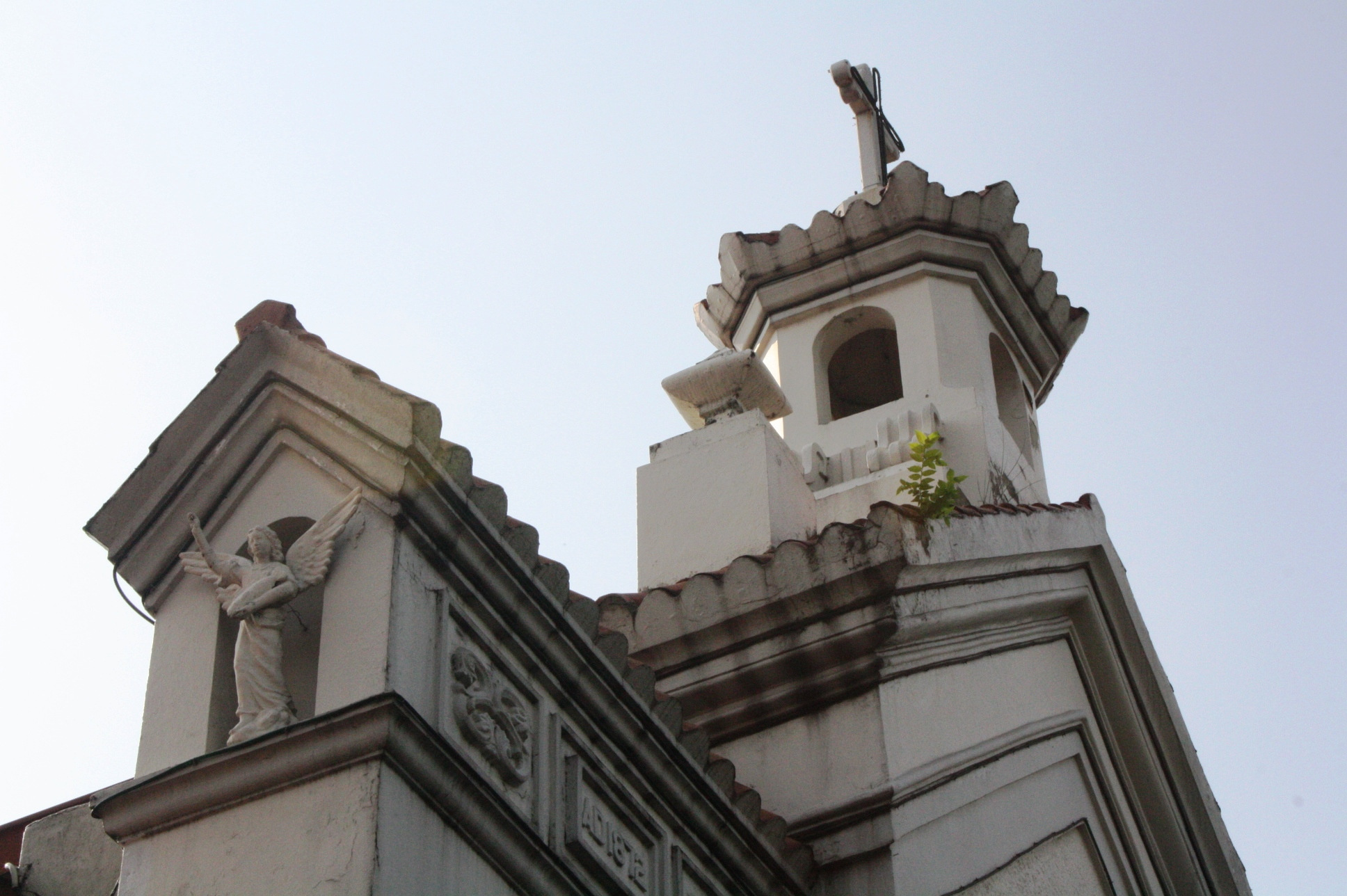
Roof details of church's façade, showing the small, decorative cupola at its apex

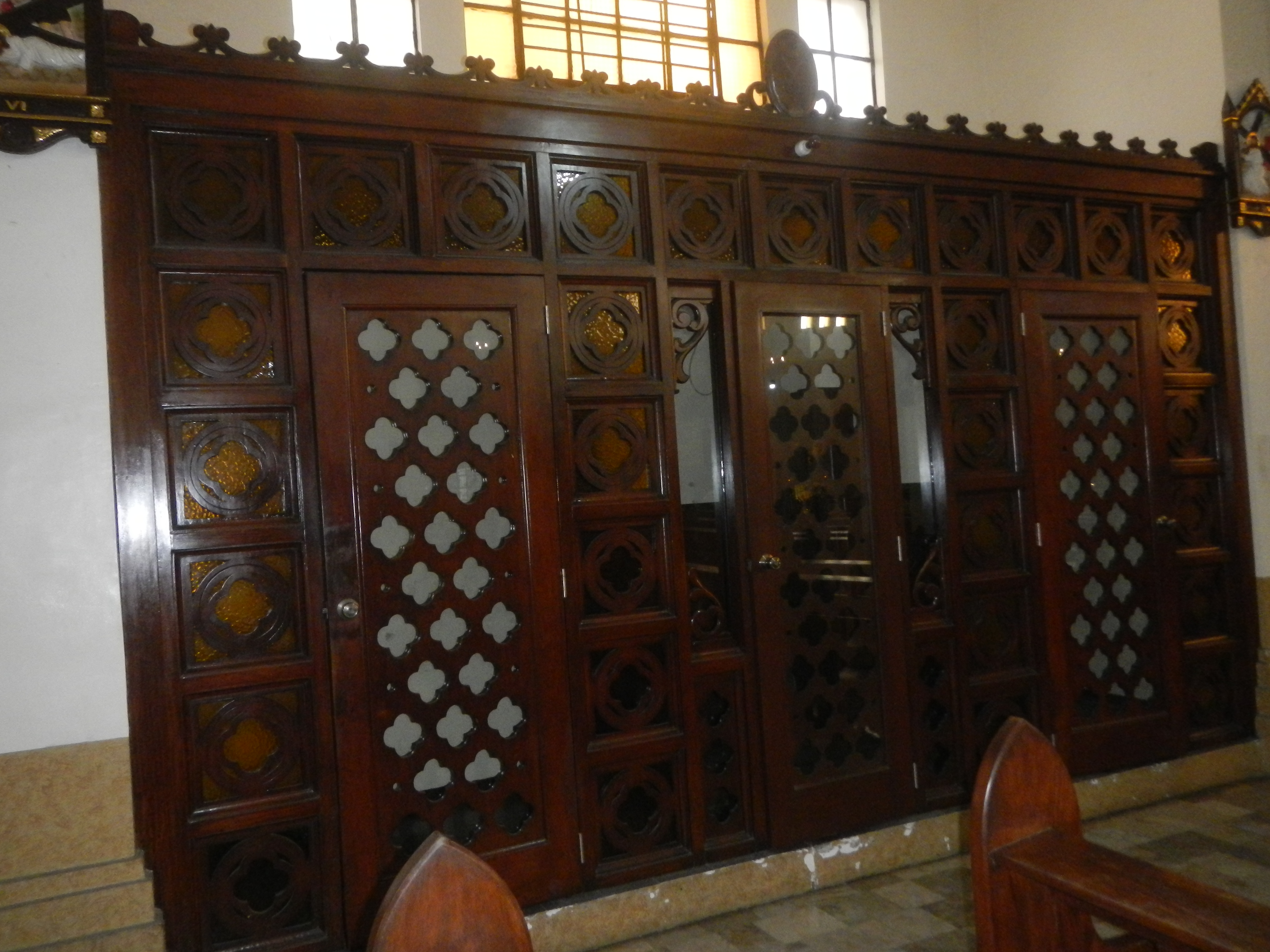
Confessional

The centennial belfry that houses the church's century-old bell.

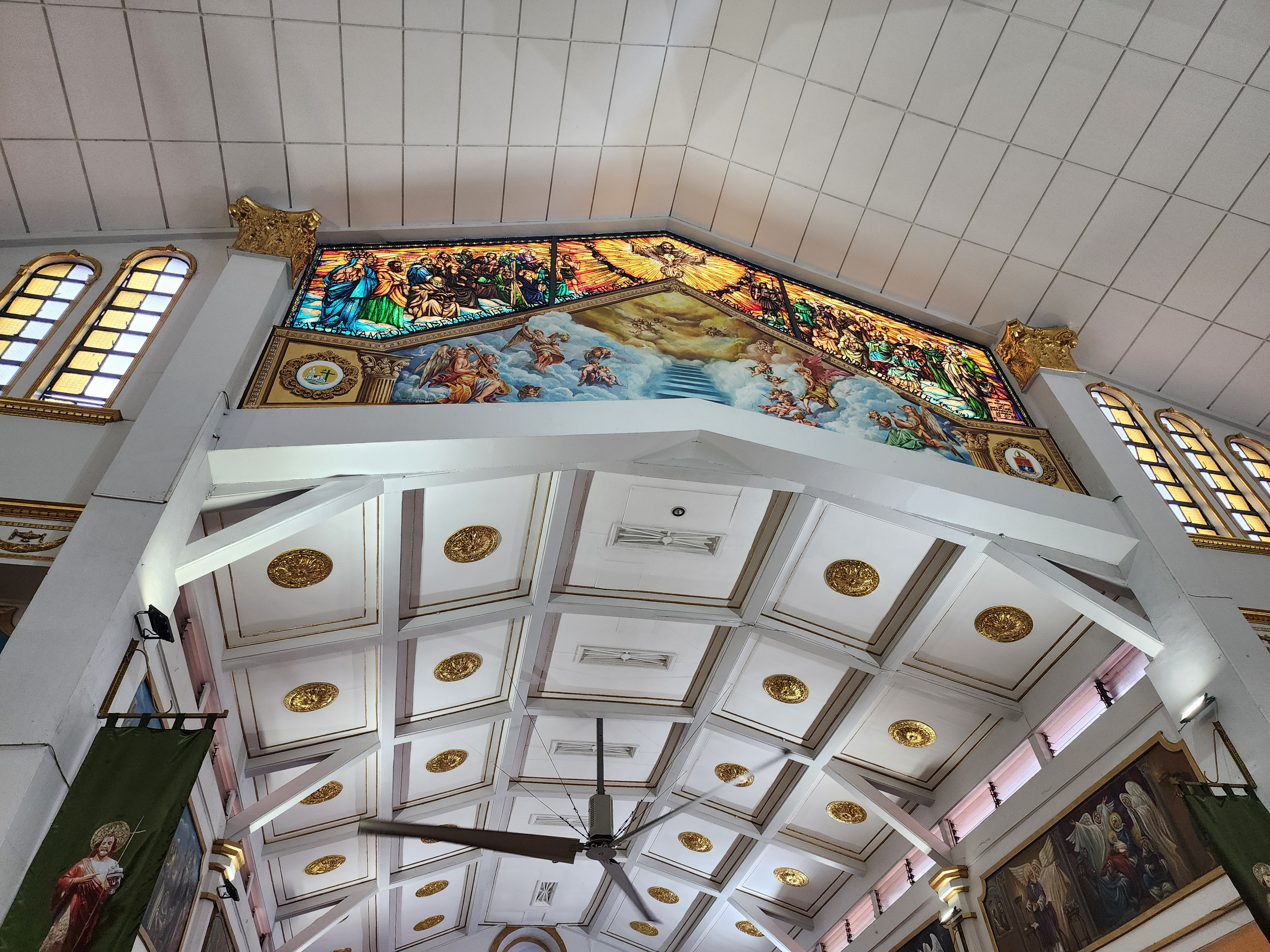
The interiors of the church's nave leading to the main door. The section with wooden gables was added during the expansion of the nave.
