= An Echo of Things to Come =

Australian high fantasy novel by James Islington

- Cover art for An Echo of Things to Come
- Author: James Islington
- Language: English
- Series: The Licanius Trilogy
- Release number: 2
- Genre: High fantasy
- Published: 22 August 2017
- Publisher: Orbit Books
- Media type: Print, ebook
- Pages: 752 (Paperback)
- ISBN: 978-0316274135
- Preceded by: The Shadow of What Was Lost
- Followed by: The Light of All That Falls
- Website: jamesislington.com

An Echo of Things to Come is a 2017 Australian high fantasy novel by James Islington. It is the second book in The Licanius Trilogy, preceded by The Shadow of What Was Lost and followed by The Light of All That Falls.

== Plot ==
Wirr has succeeded his late father as Northwarden. He survives an assassination attempt, but struggles to gain acceptance from the Administrators under his command. He meets Breshada, a former Gifted hunter who has become Gifted herself. Asha is serving as Tol Athian's Representative at court. She secretly sneaks to the Sanctuary, hoping to find evidence of missing Shadows. Davian trains at Tol Shen. He and three other Augurs escape an attack on the Tol and travel north to the Boundary.

Caeden slowly begins regaining his memories as he visits locations from his past. He also works for the Lyth, who gave him Licanius in exchange for their freedom. He is followed by Nethgalla, a shapeshifting spirit inhabiting the body of his dead wife. Caeden was once part of a group of immortals known as the Venerate, who believed they were serving El (God). The Venerate sought to destroy fate and grant humans free will. Caeden hoped to use free will and time travel to save the life of his dead wife. Caeden eventually came to believe they were mistaken and that the "god" they were serving was actually an evil spirit. He turned against the other Venerate, trapping several of them in prisons known as Tributaries, which stole their Essence to power the Boundary. Two Venerate have recently escaped their Tributaries, leading to the Boundary's weakening.

Asha learns that Shadows are being used as extra Reserves for the holder of the Siphon, a Vessel. Breshada reveals that she is both the Shadraehin and Nethgalla. She gives the Siphon to Caeden; he uses it to turn the Lyth into Shadows, which will fulfill their bargain. Nethgalla reveals that she caused the Augur War because the Augurs were threatening the stability of the Boundary. She has been using the Shadows’ Essence to sustain the Boundary since then. Nethgalla taunts Asha into stabbing her with Whisper, a sword which transfers a victim's Essence to its wielder. Asha becomes bonded to the Siphon and is no longer a Shadow.

Caeden is trapped north of the Boundary by another Venerate. Creatures begin breaking through the Boundary, killing many Administrators. Asha finds a Tributary and activates it, thus strengthening the Boundary. This traps Davian behind the Boundary. Davian kills Caeden, knowing that he will be reincarnated south of the Boundary. Caeden regains another memory of his past. He is visited by a stranger from the future, Davian, who tells him that he is mistaken about serving El. Davian attempts to convince Caeden to switch sides. Enraged, Caeden kills him and places his severed head on a spike outside Deilannis.

== Reception ==
The novel received moderately positive reviews from critics. Kirkus Reviews called the book "vastly overelaborate" but "relentlessly gripping", stating that fans of the first novel would enjoy it. Publishers Weekly called the novel "dense" and "suspenseful", predicting that it would be enjoyed by fans of epic fantasy. A reviewer for Barnes & Noble praised the emotional weight of Caeden's journey, as well as the quick pacing. Booklist compared Islington's writing positively to the works of Brandon Sanderson and Robert Jordan, while RT Book Reviews recommended the novel for fans of the genre, praising the "suspense and backstabbing political intrigue."
