= The Shadow of What Was Lost =

2014 high fantasy novel by James Islington

- Cover art for The Shadow of What Was Lost
- Author: James Islington
- Audio read by: Michael Kramer
- Language: English
- Series: The Licanius Trilogy
- Release number: 1
- Genre: High fantasy
- Publisher: Orbit Books
- Publication date: 2014 (self-published); July 2016 (ebook); November 2016 (first U.S. hardcover)
- Media type: Print, ebook, Audiobook
- Pages: 725 (Paperback)
- ISBN: 978-0316274074
- Followed by: An Echo of Things to Come
- Website: jamesislington.com

The Shadow of What Was Lost is a 2014 high fantasy novel, the debut novel by Australian author James Islington. It is the first book in The Licanius Trilogy, followed by An Echo of Things to Come and The Light of All That Falls.

== Plot summary ==
=== Premise ===
Until twenty years ago, Andarra was ruled by the Augurs, who had various powers including precognition and time manipulation. They were assisted by the Gifted, who could use their life energy, or Essence, to perform various magical tasks. Unlike Gifted, Augurs could not only draw Essence from an inner Reserve, but could also manipulate Essence from other sources by using a less understood power. Somehow, the Augurs’ abilities became corrupted and their visions became less accurate. In their struggle to keep power, a civil war broke out. Royalists led by King Kevran Andras were victorious. All known Augurs were killed and new Augurs were quickly executed, and only two Gifted schools (Tol Athien and Tol Shen) survived. The Four Tenets were instituted by the Andras family. The Tenets are a magical contract which limit the abilities of the Gifted; they must obey orders from Administrators and may not use Essence to harm others.

=== Synopsis ===
Davian is a young man studying at Caladel, a school under the supervision of the Tol Athian council. Davian learns that he is actually an Augur. He is given a Vessel, an Augur artifact, and is told that the Boundary, an ancient border north of Andarra, is failing. Behind it lie monsters led by immortal Augur Aarkein Devaed. Devaed is planning an invasion of Andarra. Davian and his best friend Wirr escape. That night, almost every remaining resident is murdered. The only survivor is their friend Asha, another young Gifted. Asha becomes Tol Athian's Representative to the Northwarden Elocian Andras, brother of the king and leader of the Administrators. Elocian tells Asha that he is secretly rescuing Augurs and regrets the creation of the Tenets.

Davian's Vessel, the Portal Box, leads them to rescue a Gifted Man named Caeden. Caeden has been accused of massacring an entire village, but has lost his memories. Davian is transported to the past. He meets a shapeshifting Augur named Malshash, who trains Davian to use Augur abilities before sending him back to his own time.

The Northwarden's Augurs have a vision of Ilin Illan, the capital city, being overrun by invaders known as the Blind. Asha, Davian, and Wirr (who is actually Elocian's son) reunite in the city. Davian discovers that Devaed's master plan involves restoring Caeden's memories. Elocian is killed by the Blind; Wirr then changes the Tenets to allow the Gifted to fight.

Caeden meets a man named Garadis, guardian of the sword Licanius. The sword may only be given to one who is not seeking it. Caeden, in his past lives has been trying to take the sword for centuries; he eventually erased his own memories and planned a pathway to lead him to Licanius. Caeden uses Licanius to kill the entire army of the Blind. Davian leaves Ilin Illan to join Tol Shen, where he will work with other Augurs to repair the Boundary. Caeden uses the Portal Stone to meet a man who can restore his memories. He requests to see the memory of the day he was accused of the village massacre, believing it will prove his innocence. He learns that he is guilty, and also that he is both Malshash and Aarkein Devaed. Caeden collapses in grief.

== Publication history ==
James Islington wrote the first draft for The Shadow of What Was Lost over multiple years, while still working full time in the tech industry. He initially pursued traditional publication, but after receiving multiple rejections he decided to self-publish the novel. After six months, and a successful number of sales, Shadow was picked up by a literary agent and the print and ebook rights were sold to Orbit Books. Orbit then re-published the book in 2016 in hardcover, paperback, and ebook.

An audiobook version was produced by Podium Entertainment, narrated by Michael Kramer, and released on Audible in 2015.

The Shadow of What Was Lost has since been translated into multiple different languages, including: Polish, Italian, French, German, Spanish, and Czech.

== Reception ==
Initially the novel received moderately positive reviews, but has continued to grow in popularity as subsequent books in the series have been released. Publishers Weekly praised the novel's complex magic, political intrigue, and large cast of characters. A reviewer for Tor.com enjoyed the worldbuilding but criticized the lack of narrative tension, stating that the novel "offers a great deal of promise" but "is ultimately very uneven". Kirkus Reviews stated that the books was a "promising page-turner from a poised newcomer". A reviewer for The Guardian called the novel an example of the "inherently derivative" subgenre of epic fantasy; despite this, the review praised Islington's "story-telling assurance [that is] rare for a debut novelist".
