= Principle of no-work-no-pay (dies non) =

In industrial relations

Dies non is a part of the Latin phrase literally meaning "a day when courts do not sit or carry on business". Dies non juridicum is the full Latin phrase literally meaning "Day without judiciary.

The expression dies non (juridicus) was used for defining a day which is not a (court) day or a day on which no legal business is carried on. Literally, dies non (juridicus) is "a not juridical day". Dictionary.com estimates that the word might have originated in 1600–10.

== Doctrine of "no-work-no-pay" ==
The doctrine of "no-work-no-pay" is a fundamental axiom in industrial relations. The philosophy is very simple. When a person is employed, it is expected that the work assigned will be carried out. When this work is not done, the employee is not eligible for payment of any salary.

Even when a general strike or countrywide ban disrupts public transport systems, and consequently employees are unable to reach their workplaces, the same principle prevails. Even die-hard trade union leaders respect this principle of equity and natural justice. "No work, no pay" lays a strong foundation to industrial peace and harmony in the long run.

== See also ==
- dies non juridicum
