= James Islington =

Australian author (born 1981)

- Born: c. 1981 (age 44–45)
- Occupation: Novelist
- Children: 2
- Writing career
- Language: English
- Years active: 2014–present
- Genre: High fantasy
- Notable work: The Shadow of What Was Lost
- Website: jamesislington.com/about-me.html

James Islington (born c. 1981) is an Australian author best known for his high fantasy series The Licanius Trilogy. He is also the author of the first two books of the Hierarchy series, the 2023 novel The Will of the Many, and 2025 novel The Strength of the Few.

== Career ==
Prior to becoming a writer, Islington ran a tech startup. Though he always liked the idea of becoming an author, he only began writing seriously at the age of 30. Islington originally self-published The Shadow of What Was Lost in 2014. He signed a deal with Orbit Books less than a year later. He has published two sequel novels, entitled An Echo of Things to Come (2017) and The Light of All That Falls (2019). Islington stated that writing the second novel was much more stressful than writing his debut novel, in part because of the increased pressure that comes from being signed by a major publishing company.

== The Licanius Trilogy ==
The first book in the series - The Shadow of What Was Lost - generally received positive reviews. Critics praised the novel's complex magic, political intrigue and varied cast of characters. Some critics, however, argued the premise was somewhat unoriginal.

== The Hierarchy ==
The Will of the Many is the first book in The Hierarchy book series. It is an epic fantasy novel and was published by Saga Press in 2023. The audiobook edition of the second book, The Strength of the Few, narrated by Euan Morton, reached #1 on Audible's bestseller lists in three categories on its release day, November 11, 2025: Historical Fantasy, Action & Adventure Fantasy, and Epic Fantasy. That same month, Sony Pictures purchased the rights to adapt the series to film.

== Bibliography ==
=== The Licanius Trilogy ===
1. The Shadow of What Was Lost. (4 August 2014). Originally self-published, later Orbit Books. ISBN 9780992580209
2. An Echo of Things to Come. (22 August 2017). Orbit. ISBN 9780316274111
3. The Light of All That Falls. (10 December 2019). Orbit. ISBN 9780356507835

=== The Hierarchy ===
1. The Will of the Many (23 May 2023). Gallery/Saga Press. ISBN 9781982141172
2. The Strength of the Few (11 November 2025). Gallery/Saga Press. ISBN 9781982141233
3. The Justice of One (expected 2027)

=== Scion ===
1. Scion (1 September 2026). Saga Press. ISBN 9781668239247

== Personal life ==
Islington was born and raised in Victoria, Australia. He and his wife live on the Mornington Peninsula. They have two children.
