= The Will of the Many =

2023 novel by James Islington

- First Saga Press hardcover edition
- Author: James Islington
- Series: The Hierarchy
- Release number: 1
- Genre: Epic fantasy
- Publisher: Gallery / Saga Press
- Publication date: 23 May 2023
- Pages: 774
- ISBN: 1982141174
- Followed by: The Strength of the Few

The Will of the Many is an epic fantasy novel written by Australian author James Islington and published by Saga Press in 2023. It is the first book in The Hierarchy series, with a second book, The Strength of the Few, published on 11 November 2025.

The book takes place in Caten, a fictional society with similarities to the Golden Age of the Roman Republic. In Caten, the lower classes must cede a portion of their mental and physical energy (known as Will) to the classes above them. The story follows the orphaned Vis Telimus as he is recruited for the prestigious Catenan Academy and tasked with rising through the cutthroat competition to uncover the secret behind a mysterious accident. But Vis has his own shadowed past, and it threatens to follow him even into the heart of the Republic.

== Premise ==
Three hundred years prior to the events of the book, an unknown Cataclysm nearly destroyed the world, obliterating existing civilizations and leaving fewer than one person in twenty alive.

In the centuries since, the Catenan Republic has conquered what's left of the known world. The Republic sustains its dominance by using remnants of Pre-Cataclysm technology to force the lowest classes to cede their mental and physical energy, called Will, to the classes above them. The system results in a handful of elites who can wield the strength of hundreds, allowing the Hierarchy to undertake enormous construction projects, travel vast distances, and expand its empire.

But with no more territory to conquer, tensions have heightened and factions within Caten have started to jockey for control. One of the most crucial arenas for this growing power struggle is the elite Catenan Academy, where the sons and daughters of the Republic's most powerful families compete to earn placements in the Hierarchy's structure.

== Plot ==
Three years before the start of the book, the Catenan Republic attacks the island kingdom of Suus and executes the royal family. Only Prince Diago survives, and he goes into hiding at the edges of society under the name of "Vis." The book begins with Vis working as a guard in the brutal Catenan prisons and fighting on the underground circuit to earn money that will help him escape the Hierarchy altogether. During a strange interrogation, however, Vis catches the attention of Magnus Quintus Ulciscor, a powerful senator, and begins to see another way out. In exchange for his adoption, Vis agrees to train for the Catenan Academy and investigate the mysterious death of Ulciscor's brother, which happened at the Academy. While traveling to Deditia, Catenan's capital, Vis and Ulciscor are ambushed by the Anguis, a rebel group resisting the power of the Hierarchy. They escape the attack after the Anguis leader recognizes Vis as Prince Diago and tries to strike a deal with him. At Ulciscor's estate, Vis is prepared for the Academy by Lanistia, a former Academy student blinded in the same mysterious accident that killed Ulciscor's brother.

The Anguis set up a second meeting with Vis during the Festival of Jovan, but Vis again refuses to join them due to their brutal methods. At the festival, Vis attends a mock sea battle with Aequa, another student attending the Academy. During the mock battle, the leader of the Anguis appears and lays waste to the crowd with a mysterious weapon, killing tens of thousands of spectators. Vis helps Aequa to escape, then returns to confront the Anguis leader, who dies by suicide while making it appear as if Vis killed him. Vis's apparent heroicism earns him the approval of the Catenan Senate and smooths his entrance into the Academy.

At the Catenan Academy, Vis befriends Callidus, the son of one of the most powerful men in the Catenan Republic, and Eidhin, a foreign student with limited knowledge of the language but extensive fighting skills. Vis also meets Emissa and Indol, two of the top-ranked students at the school, who take an interest in Vis because of his supposed origins as an orphan and his exploits at the Festival of Jovan. The school is overseen by Principalis Veridius, who was once a close friend to Lanistia and Ulciscor's brother, and whom Ulciscor now believes is responsible for the strange accident.

Along with the challenges of the Academy, Vis faces constant pressure from Ulciscor to discover the secret of his brother's death, which Ulciscor believes is related to the mysterious ruins of a Pre-Cataclysm society on the island. While searching the ruins, Vis discovers a chamber filled with script in an unknown language and, disturbingly, hundreds of bodies that are blinded in the same way as Lanistia. At another ruin, Vis encounters a labyrinth that is identical to one the Academy uses to train students. While experimenting with the labyrinth, Vis interacts with strange figures who warn him about the dangers of something called "Synchronism." When these figures enter the labyrinth, they are torn apart by wraiths of swirling obsidian glass.

Despite difficulties, Vis rises rapidly through the ranks of the Academy. When he is forced to duel another student for his position, Eidhin helps him, and reveals part of his background training with the famed Bladesmiths of his tribe. Like Vis, Eidhin's people were attacked by the Hierarchy. As he rises to the top ranks of the Academy, Vis is invited by Indol and Emissa to train with them during the semester break at Indol's home, which Vis realizes is in his former kingdom of Suus. During the trip Vis grows closer with Emissa, and they kiss after Vis rescues her from drowning. To earn entrance to the final rank at the Academy, he defeats another student in Foundation, a game of strategy he learned as a boy on Suus.

At the end of the year, Vis is ordered by Ulciscor to run the labyrinth in the ruins or face imprisonment. Simultaneously, the Anguis pressure him through blackmail to graduate at the top of the class, which will guarantee that he can choose a position within the Hierarchy. During the final competition to determine class placements, Vis returns to the ruins and runs the labyrinth. Upon making it through, he enters a chamber that claims to be a pathway to Obiteum and Luceum. He falls unconscious and awakes in a seemingly unchanged room, now surrounded by indistinct hovering figures. Though he's initially trapped, writing appears suddenly on his arm to guide him out of the chamber, and he escapes with only an odd bite on the arm from one of the hovering figures.

Vis returns to the competition, but realizes that the Academy's safety teams have been killed and replaced by members of the Anguis, who are now hunting the remaining students. Vis helps other students to escape, but his wound from the labyrinth continues to worsen. When nearing the end of the competition, Vis encounters Emissa, who sees the strange and distinctive wound on Vis's arm. Distraught, she attempts to kill Vis. He survives the attempt, though it delays his rescue of Callidus from the Anguis saboteurs, causing Callidus's death. Vis returns to the Academy and is declared the winner of the competition. Principalis Veridius, showing knowledge of the labyrinth, promises to explain everything and claims to be trying to prevent a second Cataclysm. Though he begs Vis to choose a position under him, Vis refuses, deciding instead to gather more information by joining Governance and working under Callidus's father.

In the epilogue, called "Synchronism," an alternate version of Vis awakens in the chamber after running the labyrinth in the ruins. Symbols around him suggest he is in Luceum. A third version of Vis wakes up in Obiteum, where he is greeted by Ulciscor's brother, who warns him of a larger conflict.

== Main characters ==
- Vis Telimus – A fugitive orphan adopted by Ulciscor Telimus. Previously known as Diago.
- Ulciscor Telimus – Magnus Quintus member of the Military Senate. Adoptive father of Vis Telimus.
- Lanistia Scipio – Sextus residing in Ulciscor's family estate. Tutor to Vis. Previous classmate of the deceased Caeror Telimus (brother to Ulciscor).
- Sedotia – Member of the Anguis rebel group resisting the Hierarchy.
- Relucia Telimus – Sextus wife to Ulciscor Telimus.
- Veridius Julii – The Principalis, in charge of the Academy.
- Callidus Ericius – Class seven student at the Academy. Friend to Vis.
- Eidhin Breac – Class six student at the Academy. Fought with Vis during his first day attending the Academy.
- Aequa Claudius – Class four student at the Academy. Attended the naumachia with Vis.
- Emissa Corenius – Class three student at the Academy. Spent time with Vis mucking out the Academy stables.

== Reception ==
The novel received positive reviews. Kirkus Reviews praised the novel's magic system and exploration of themes of complicity and complacency, while a review on Tor.com noted the "expansive, intricate, layered world." A review from Publishers Weekly stated that "Islington’s worldbuilding is exceptionally detailed and thoughtful, making suspending disbelief effortless. Perfectly balancing character development and plot momentum, this will have fantasy fans clamoring for more."

== Awards ==
The audiobook edition, narrated by Euan Morton and released by Audible on 23 May 2023, won an Earphones Award in the Fantasy category in July 2023. In September 2026, ten months after the release of the sequel The Strength of the Few, both audiobooks continued to hold the top two positions on Amazon's Historical Fantasy bestseller list, with The Will of the Many at #1 and The Strength of the Few at #2.
