= Iura novit curia =

Legal maxim: the court knows the law

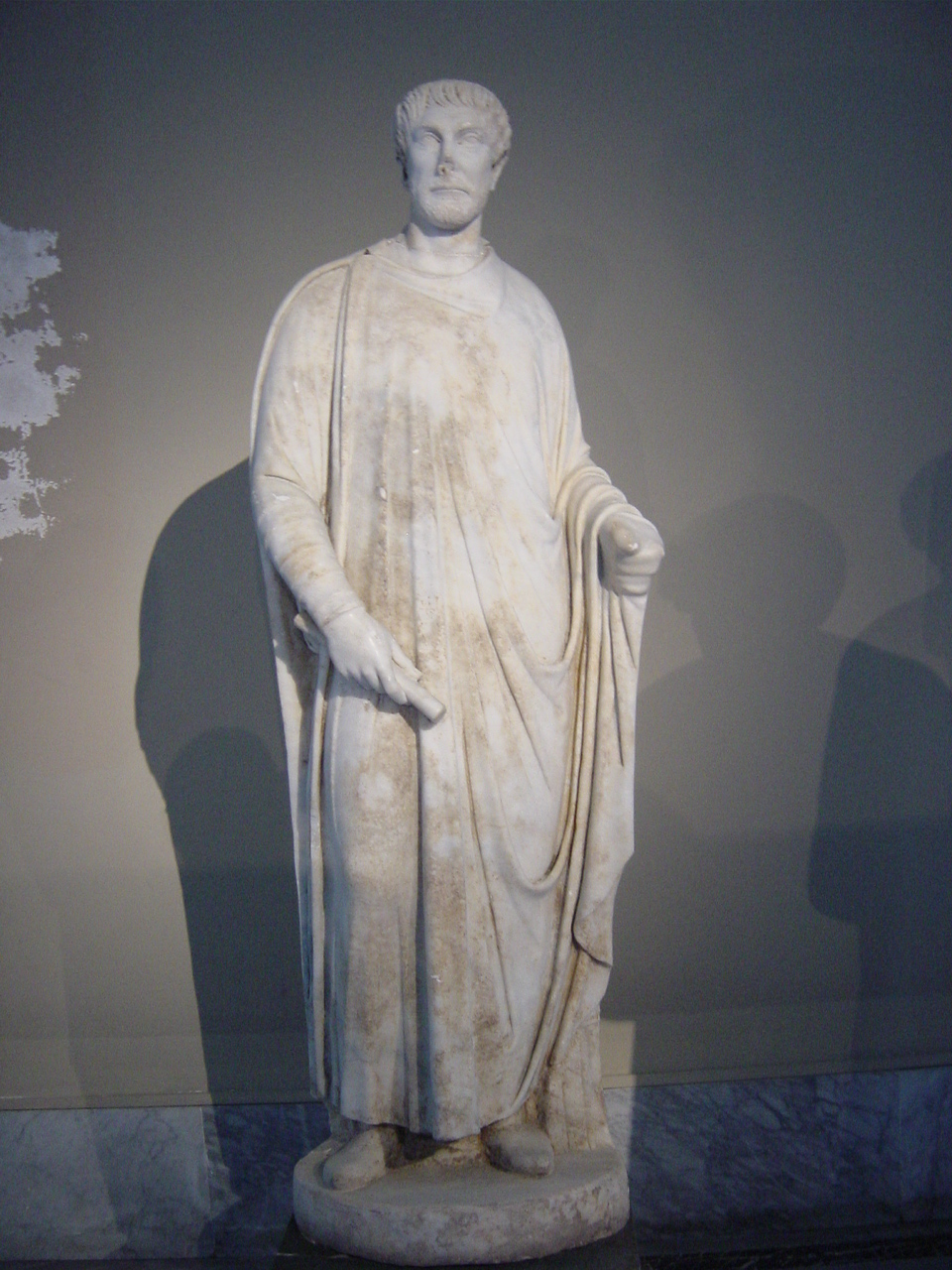
An ancient Roman judge

Iura novit curia is a Latin legal maxim expressing the principle that "the court knows the law", i.e., that the parties to a legal dispute do not need to plead or prove the law that applies to their case. The maxim is sometimes quoted as jura novit curia, iura noscit curia, curia iura novit, curia novit legem or variants thereof. The maxim is applied principally in civil law systems and is part of the investigative ("inquisitorial") aspect of that legal tradition, as distinguished from the more pronouncedly adversarial approach of common law legal systems. The maxim is first found in the writings of the medieval glossators about ancient Roman law.

== Principle ==
Iura novit curia means that the court alone is responsible for determining which law applies to a particular case, and how. The court applies the law ex officio, that is, without being limited to the legal arguments advanced by the parties (although the court is normally limited to granting the relief sought by the parties). The same principle is also expressed in the related maxim da mihi factum, dabo tibi ius ("give me the facts and I shall give you the law"), sometimes also given as narra mihi factum, narro tibi ius: it is incumbent on the parties to furnish the facts of a case and the responsibility of the judge to establish the applicable law. The maxim also means the parties cannot limit the court's legal cognition (that is, the authority to determine the applicable law).

In its most wide-reaching form, the principle of iura novit curia allows the court to base its decision on a legal theory that has not been the subject of argument by the parties. However, in view of the parties' right to be heard (audiatur et altera pars) and the adversarial principle, both also recognized in civil law systems, this freedom is not unlimited. Many jurisdictions require the court to allow the parties to address any points of law first raised by the court itself.

Because a wide application of iura novit curia may conflict with the parties' authority (in private law) to decide what is to be the subject of litigation, courts in most jurisdictions normally stay within the bounds established by the pleadings and arguments of the parties. In criminal law, the court's freedom to apply the law is generally constrained at least to some extent by the legal characterization of the alleged facts in the indictment.

== Exceptions ==
The principle of iura novit curia may be subject to exceptions. For instance, courts may be required by law to submit certain questions of law (such as the constitutionality of a statute, or the application of European law) to the review of a specialized other court (such as a constitutional court or the European Court of Justice). The codes of procedure may also provide that the court may call upon the parties or experts to prove or determine any applicable foreign law. In common law countries in particular, the rule is iura aliena non novit curia, i.e., judges may not rely on their own knowledge of foreign law, but the party who relies on it must prove it. In civil law systems, the same rule generally applies in attenuated forms: judges may (or should to the extent possible) make their own investigations of foreign law.

== Applicability ==
=== In civil and common law legal systems ===
According to Mattias Derlén, "it has traditionally been claimed that jura novit curia applies in civil law systems but not in common law systems". Francis Jacobs described this view as follows:

It might be tempting to suggest that there is a basic distinction between two fundamentally different types of procedure within the Member States: a distinction between, broadly speaking, the continental systems on the one hand and the English, Irish and Scottish systems on the other. On that view, the court in the continental systems is deemed to know the law ('jura novit curia' or 'curia novit legem'); it must apply the appropriate legal rules to the facts as they are presented to the court by the parties ('da mihi factum, dabo tibi jus'); and if necessary it will engage for that purpose in its own legal research. In the English, Irish and Scottish systems, on the other hand, the court has a less active, or even a passive, role: the procedure is generally based on the assumption that the court has no independent knowledge of the law, that it is dependent upon the submissions advanced by counsel for the parties, and that its function essentially is to adjudicate on the exclusive basis of their submissions. According to one commentator, 'perhaps the most spectacular feature of English procedure is that the rule curia novit legem has never been and is not part of English law'.

Jacobs explains that this distinction is exaggerated on closer examination. Civil law courts, iura novit curia notwithstanding, may not exceed the limits of the case as defined by the claims of the parties and may not generally raise a new point involving new issues of fact. A common law court can also sua sponte take a point which is a matter of public policy; for instance, it can refuse to enforce an illegal contract even if no party raises this point. The common law's lack of the rule of iura novit curia therefore has some relevance in civil proceedings, but matters little in criminal proceedings or in administrative courts.

=== In international law ===
Iura novit curia is widely applied by international courts as a general principle of law. While the ICTY declined to do so in one case, the regulations of the International Criminal Court now provide for it. The principle has also been recognized by the International Court of Justice as generally applicable in international proceedings, as well as by the Inter-American Court of Human Rights, or the World Trade Organization's adjudicating bodies.
