= Landline (disambiguation) =

A landline telephone is attached to the telephone network by a cable.

Landline (or Land Line, Land-Line) may also refer to:

- Landline (TV program), on matters in rural Australia
- Landline (film), a 2017 comedy film
- Landline (novel), a 2014 sci-fi novel by Rainbow Rowell
- Land-Line, a former dataset from the Ordnance Survey, the UK mapping body
- Land Line Magazine, for American truckers
