= Home Street Home =

Home Street Home may refer to:

- A Broadway musical written by Fat Mike, Soma Snakeoil, and Jeff Marx
- A forthcoming album by the rapper Spice 1
- A Saint Paul, MN food truck
