= Carry On (novel) =

2015 novel by Rainbow Rowell

- Author: Rainbow Rowell
- Cover artist: Olga Grlic and Kevin Wada
- Language: English
- Genre: Urban fantasy
- Publisher: St. Martin's Press
- Publication date: October 2015
- Publication place: United States
- Media type: Print (Hardback), Print (Paperback), Audiobook
- Pages: 528
- ISBN: 1250049555
- Followed by: Wayward Son

Carry On: The Rise and Fall of Simon Snow is the third young adult novel written by Rainbow Rowell, published in 2015. The story follows the final year of magical schooling for Simon Snow, the "Chosen One" of the Magical world, prophesied to defeat the Insidious Humdrum, an evil force that has been wreaking havoc on the World of Mages for years. The novel is told through several narrative voices, including that of Simon, his roommate/enemy Baz, his best friend Penelope, and his ex-girlfriend Agatha.

The novel is a spinoff from Rowell's novel Fangirl. "Simon Snow" is the name of the fictional series of novels that the protagonist in Fangirl (Cath) is a die-hard fan of. Carry On, Simon is the name of the novel-within-a-novel-based-on-a-book-series that Cath is writing in Fangirl. However, Rowell has said that Carry On is a novel written by herself, and should not be seen as Cath’s fictional work “Carry On Simon”, which features in Fangirl.

== Plot ==
Simon Snow is an 18-year-old orphaned magician returning to Watford School of Magicks for his eighth and final year. Raised among the "Normals" (humans without magical powers) Simon was discovered as a child by his mentor The Mage, who is the headmaster of Watford, and the leader of the magical world. Simon has an unprecedented amount of magical power, and is thus dubbed "The Chosen One", the prophesied Greatest Mage. The prophecy states that one will come to end magic (believed to be a recently appeared creature called the Insidious Humdrum) and one (believed to be Simon) will bring its fall. Around the time of Simon's birth, magical "dead spots" started appearing all over England, places where magic no longer exists, and magical beings are unable to use their powers. Their appearance is attributed to the Humdrum.

The book is also frequently interrupted by short chapters narrated by a character named Lucy, who reflects on her own times at Watford years ago, and her budding relationship with another student named Davy, a man obsessed with the prophecy of the Greatest Mage.

Simon reunites with Penelope and the shy goatherd Ebb, as well as his beautiful girlfriend Agatha Wellbelove. Despite their seemingly perfect relationship, Agatha yearns for independence and breaks up with Simon. Yet another point of contention in Simon's life is his vampire roommate Basilton "Baz" Grimm-Pitch, whom he considers his "nemesis." For the first two months of the school year, Baz is absent with no explanation, to Simon's frustration.

During October, when the veil between the living and the dead is thin, Simon is visited by Natasha Grimm-Pitch, Baz's mother and the former headmistress of Watford before The Mage. With Baz missing, she instead asks Simon to avenge her murder (seemingly committed by vampires) and to find "Nicodemus." When Baz returns, having been kidnapped by creatures called Numpties and only recently escaped, he, Simon, and Penelope try to research Natasha's death and discover who Nicodemus is, but to little success.

Over Christmas break, Simon learns from Ebb that she had a twin brother named Nicodemus; however, after graduating, Nicodemus asked a vampire to turn him in order to gain immortality. His request was fulfilled, but he was banished from the magical world. Simon rushes to Baz's house to inform him, interrupting the Pitch family celebrations.

They track Nicodemus to a bar in the West End, yet he only tells them that a few weeks before the attack, a magician came to him and brokered a deal to have him and other vampires attack Watford. Nicodemus at the time said no, yet refuses to tell Simon and Baz the wizard's name. Baz storms off and, torn at the idea that he has failed, intends to kill himself through self immolation. Simon talks him out of it and kisses him.

Agatha and Penelope travel to Baz's house the next morning at Baz's request. Baz and Penelope explain their investigation to Agatha, but she is wary of going behind the Mage's back and shocked that Simon and Baz are now apparent friends; she leaves with Penelope, while Simon comes back to stay with Baz. They have Christmas Eve dinner with the Pitch family.

After dropping off Penelope, Agatha has a conversation with her mum. Mrs. Wellbelove gossips with her daughter about a witch named Lucy Salisbury who reportedly ran off to America with a Normal after having an illegitimate child, and swore off magic. Agatha becomes entranced by the idea of also escaping her pressuring life to somewhere else.

Meanwhile, Lucy remembers beginning a relationship with Davy and they move in together following their graduation. Davy convinces himself that he is destined to bring about the Greatest Mage, and impregnates Lucy one night, convinced he is the Greatest Mage's father.

The Humdrum attacks Simon at Baz's house and drains the area of its magic, creating a dead spot. However, he claims that he did not take the magic and is merely "what’s left when you're done." Simon uses his powers to sprout wings and flies away to Penelope's house.

The next morning, Baz shows up at the Bunce family's doorstep. While looking at the map of dead spots, Baz shows that they all appeared on the dates that Simon has used powerful magical attacks over the years. He theorizes that Simon cannot simply make more power; he takes it from different locations in Britain without realizing it, thus creating the dead spots. Baz and Penelope also believe that the Humdrum is merely an echo or a hole that Simon created due to tearing out so much magic at once, explaining why the Humdrum looks like an eleven year old Simon. Simon wants to tell the Mage, but Baz is against this and thus Simon travels to Watford alone.

Ebb is arrested by the Mage, causing Nicodemus to join Baz's side, and informs them the identity of the wizard who approached him to as a demonstration of trust: it was the Mage, who hired the vampires to kill Baz's mother in order to take power and incite panic. Baz and Penelope head off to confront him and save Simon.

At Watford, the Mage attempts to take Ebb's magic, wanting to make himself powerful enough to defeat the Humdrum on his own. In the struggle, he stabs her just as Simon arrives. Simon attempts to revive her while the Mage tries to convince Simon to give him his magic, as he believes Simon is not the proper vessel for the Greatest Mage. The Insidious Humdrum appears, and Simon, now understanding of the Humdrum's situation, gives the Humdrum all of his magic in order to "fill the hole." Baz and Penny show up and Simon accidentally kills the Mage. Baz comforts Simon as he sobs over the Mage's corpse.

Lucy planned to name her baby Simon Snow Salisbury. When she went into labour, Davy, now revealed to have been the Mage, performed a ritual to make the unborn child a vessel for unexplainable power. She died in childbirth and Davy hid a newborn Simon among the Normals with the name "Simon Snow" written on the baby's arm. It is shown that the chapters are being told from the perspective of Lucy's ghost, who attempts to visit Simon during the veil lift in October, but is unsuccessful.

In an epilogue, Agatha has moved to California and adopted a cocker spaniel which she has named Lucy. There has been a trial, and Mitali Bunce (Penelope’s mother) is now the new headmistress of Watford. Baz returned to Watford for his final year, but Simon no longer has any magic left, and Penelope dropped out to support him. Baz and Simon are now officially dating and Simon moves into a flat with Penelope.

== Themes ==
=== Homosexuality ===
Baz is revealed to be gay early in the novel, calling himself "queer" and wondering how his father would react if he failed to carry on his family name. When Simon eventually acts upon his attraction to Baz and kisses him, Simon does not consider himself "gay" and decides he will sort out his sexual orientation later. He discusses it with his therapist and thinks he might be gay, while his therapist tells him it's not an important thing to consider at the time. Simon has previously had a romantic relationship with a girl, Agatha. One female character, Ebb Petty, has had relationships with other women, but it is not discussed in detail. Additionally, Penelope's roommate, Trixie, has a girlfriend.

=== Magic ===
The novel pays obvious homage to the Harry Potter series through the content of its fictional world, overall story structure, and extensive fandom (which is explained in Fangirl). Both Hogwarts and Watford are magical schools that have been in existence for centuries and both are located in the United Kingdom. However, Watford offers eight years of schooling rather than seven - but it is mentioned that the eighth year is optional. The magical learning that goes on inside the two schools, and the rules of magic, are quite different.

Each student is endowed with a magical object through which they channel their magic. Some have wands, but other students have specific pieces of jewelry or clothing that they use to control their magic. Spells are created by using common turns of phrase, such as "Head over heels!" and "Up, up and away!" In one specific instance, the Mage uses lyrics from the Queen song "Bohemian Rhapsody."

=== Class tensions ===
There are distinct classes within the magical community. Powerful families are members of the Mage's Council, and they are responsible for ensuring the magical line lives on through their children and is preserved at Watford. Many students at Watford, especially Agatha, worry about finding suitable mates for their prestigious magical heritage in order to preserve their family's magic and continue producing magical children. Those who are not part of this prestigious group find themselves wondering if they have a place in the magical community, since members of the Old Families feel that they do not. There are mounting conflicts between the Mage and the Old Families throughout the book because of his reforms and invasion of privacy, and because of suspicion that the Mage was controlling the Humdrum.

== Main characters ==
- Simon Snow, "The Chosen One" is the main character. He has curly bronze hair, blue eyes and is approximately 180 centimeters.
- Tyrannus Basilton "Baz" Grimm-Pitch the Third is a student at Watford, Simon's roommate and eventual boyfriend.
- Penelope "Penny" Bunce is a student at Watford, Simon's best friend and has bright red hair.
- Agatha Wellbelove is student at Watford, Simon's ex-girlfriend with perfectly straight blond hair that naturally frames her face.
- The Mage or Davy, the headmaster of Watford and Simon's councillor. He is also supposedly Simon's father.
- Ebeneza "Ebb" Petty is a goatherd at Watford and Nicodemus's "Nicky" sister.
- Natasha Grimm-Pitch is Baz's deceased mother, former Headmistress of Watford.
- Lucy Salisbury is Davy's romantic partner and Simon's deceased biological mother.
- Fiona Pitch is Baz's aunt, who lives to avenge her sister's death.

== Sequels ==
A sequel, titled Wayward Son, was announced on June 3, 2018. Though originally scheduled to be released in 2020, Rowell posted a new promotional image on various social media platforms on November 7, 2018, with a new release year of 2019. It was later confirmed that Wayward Son would be available for purchase on September 24, 2019.

On October 1, 2020, Any Way the Wind Blows, the third and final book in the Simon Snow series, was announced. It was released on July 6, 2021.

== Reception ==
The critical reception for the book has been mostly positive. The New York Times Book Review said: "Rowell imbues her magic with awe and spectacle. It's a powerful, politically minded allegory about sexual, ethnic and class identity - with a heady shot of teenage lust." Writing for NPR, Amal El-Mohtar called it the best Harry Potter fan fiction she'd ever read while also praising it as being wildly fun, deliciously readable, immersive and compulsive as a stand-alone book separated from its context. Slate said "Carry On makes a case for fan fiction’s literary legitimacy. It’s not easy to mimic, deconstruct, and remix the elements of a magical world in the way Rowell has here." The audiobook, narrated by Euan Morton, received an AudioFile Earphones Award in 2015.
