= Wayward =

Wayward may refer to:

- Wayward (comics)
- Wayward (film), a 1932 drama film
- Wayward, a 2013 novel in The Wayward Pines Trilogy
- Hunter: The Reckoning – Wayward
- Wayward (miniseries), a 2025 Canadian–British thriller miniseries created by Mae Martin for Netflix
- Wayward Sisters:
  - The Three Witches from William Shakespeare's play Macbeth
  - "Wayward Sisters", a 2018 episode of the 13th season of the TV series Supernatural
  - Wayward Sisters (TV series), a cancelled spin-off TV series of Supernatural
  - "Wayward Sister" (song), an aria from the opera Dido and Aeneas, by Henry Purcell; see List of compositions by Henry Purcell

== See also ==
- Wayward Son (disambiguation)
