= Euan Morton =

Scottish actor (born 1977)

- Born: Iain Douglas George Middleton; 13 August 1977 (age 49); Falkirk, Scotland, UK
- Other name: Iain Middleton
- Education: Mountview Academy of Theatre Arts
- Occupations: Singer, actor, voice artist
- Partner: Lee Armitage
- Children: Iain Armitage
- Awards: Tony Award nomination (2004); Helen Hayes Award (2012); Obie Award (2006); Audie Award (2019); Theatre World Award (2004); Bistro Award (2009); Full list

Euan Morton (born Iain Douglas George Middleton; 13 August 1977) is a Scottish actor and singer from Falkirk, Scotland, UK. He is best known for his Tony Award-nominated role as Boy George in the musical Taboo, and for his record-breaking six-year tenure as King George in Hamilton on Broadway from July 2017 to 10 September 2023, becoming the longest-running actor in the role in the musical's Broadway history. Morton is also an award-winning audiobook narrator with two Audie Awards (Dune, 2008; Crimson Lake, 2019) and eleven Earphones Awards, including one for The Will of the Many by James Islington (2023) and a Kirkus Earphones Award for Wolf Hour by Jo Nesbø (2026). He has narrated for major publishers including Macmillan Audio, Penguin Random House, Simon & Schuster, and HarperCollins. His narration of James Islington's The Strength of the Few (2025) became a #1 Audible bestseller across multiple fantasy categories on release day. Notable narrations include Frank Herbert's Dune series, in which he voices Paul Atreides in Dune (2007) and Dune Messiah (2007), Rainbow Rowell's Carry On trilogy, and works by Christopher Moore.

== Early life ==
Morton was born in Falkirk. He began acting in his local children's theatre. After graduating from Mountview Academy of Theatre Arts in London, Morton worked for Profit Share Theatre and for film and television in the UK.

== Career ==
=== Stage career ===
Morton appeared in The Silent Treatment at the Finborough Theatre, London, in 2001. He then played the role of Boy George in the musical Taboo in the West End in 2002, and on Broadway in 2003. He was nominated for a Laurence Olivier Award in the UK, and a Tony Award, Drama Desk Award, Outer Critics Circle Award and Drama League Award, and received a Theatre World Award in the US, for his performance in the role of Boy George.

He played the role of Ligniere in the play "Cyrano de Bergerac" from October 2007 to January 2008 on Broadway at the Richard Rodgers Theatre. Morton performed in the musical revue Sondheim on Sondheim, conceived and directed by James Lapine in 2010, which premiered on Broadway at Studio 54 and was presented by the Roundabout Theatre.

Off-Broadway, he appeared in the title role of Tony Kushner's adaptation of Brundibár at The New Victory Theater in 2006. He won the 2006 Obie Award for his appearance in Measure For Pleasure at The Public Theater. He played the title role in the musical Caligula: An Ancient Glam Epic at the inaugural New York Musical Theatre Festival in September 2004. He appeared, along with Alfred Molina, in the Roundabout Theatre Company's new production of Howard Katz by Patrick Marber, which ran Off-Broadway at the Laura Pels Theater from 1 March 2007 to 6 May 2007. He appeared in the musical Atomic which ran at the Acorn Theatre from 13 July 2014 to 16 August 2014, in the role of J. Robert Oppenheimer.

In regional theatre, he played the title role in The Who's Tommy at the Bay Street Theatre in Sag Harbor, New York in the year 2006. In 2010, he played Anatoly Sergievsky in the Signature Theatre (Arlington, Virginia) production of Chess. In 2011, he played the role of Launce in Two Gentlemen of Verona at Shakespeare Theatre Company. He appeared in the play Heart of Robin Hood, written by David Farr, which played in Winnipeg and Toronto in December 2014 through March 2015, in the role of Prince John.

Morton won a Helen Hayes Award for his performance as Leo Frank in the musical Parade at Ford's Theatre in Washington, D.C. from September to October 2011. Also in 2011, he sang the role of Renfield in the 2011 studio recording of Frank Wildhorn's Dracula, the Musical, singing "Master's Song" and the reprise of that song. He played the role of Sherlock Holmes in Ken Ludwig's Baskerville: A Sherlock Holmes Mystery at the Old Globe Theatre in San Diego, California, in 2015. He assumed the role of Hedwig in the US tour of Hedwig and The Angry Inch from November 2016 to July 2017.

He took over the role of King George in Hamilton on Broadway in July 2017 and played the role until September 2023.

He starred as Leo in the North American première of Ceilidh, an immersive Scottish musical at the M&T Bank Exchange in Baltimore, Maryland, from September 6 to October 12, 2025.

=== Voice work ===
From 2011 to 2022, he provided the voice for the male Sith Inquisitor player character in the MMORPG Star Wars: The Old Republic, created by BioWare and LucasArts, a role that spanned over eleven years and eight major expansions. His work included approximately 20,000 lines of dialogue with multiple variations for different player choices. He also voiced the 9.5 hour long audiobook Star Wars: Tarkin released in November 2014.

From 2019 to 2024, Morton provided the voice for George, a recurring demonic character, in the CBS/Paramount+ supernatural drama series Evil.

Morton's voice work spans multiple genres and publishers. For Christopher Moore, he has narrated Fool (2009), Sacré Bleu (2012), The Serpent of Venice (2014), and Shakespeare for Squirrels (2020), the latter receiving an AudioFile Earphones Award for Fantasy. He narrated the Kilo Five trilogy by Karen Traviss, set in the Halo universe, for Simon & Schuster. For Rainbow Rowell, he narrated the complete Simon Snow trilogy — Carry On (2015), Wayward Son (2019), and Any Way the Wind Blows (2021) — earning an AudioFile Earphones Award for each installment, as well as a Simon Snow short story in Rowell's collection Scattered Showers (2022). He has also narrated multiple thrillers by Jo Nesbø, including Macbeth (2018), The Kingdom (2020), The Jealousy Man and Other Stories (2021), Blood Ties (2025), and Wolf Hour (2026), the last of which received the Kirkus Earphones Award in the Thriller & Suspense category. For Adam Gidwitz, he narrated Max in the House of Spies (2023), which won the Good Housekeeping Best Kids' Book award (2024), and Max in the Land of Lies (2024), which received an AudioFile Earphones Award for Children (2025). He also provided voice work for the 2009 animated film My Dog Tulip.

In 2025, Morton provided vocals for the Netflix animated film The Twits, based on Roald Dahl's children's book. Morton performed two original songs written by David Byrne of Talking Heads: "We're Not Like Ev'ryone Else" and "The Problem Is You," both duets with actress Margo Martindale, who voices Mrs. Twit in the film. The songs appear on the official soundtrack album released by Netflix Music on October 17, 2025, alongside the film's premiere.

Morton's narration of The Strength of the Few by James Islington reached number one on Audible's bestseller lists in 3 categories (Historical Fantasy, Action & Adventure Fantasy and Epic Fantasy) on its release day, November 11, 2025. His previous narration of the series' first book, The Will of the Many, simultaneously held the #2 position in Historical Fantasy.

=== Solo recording career ===
In addition to his theatrical work, Morton has released two solo studio albums.

==== NewClear (2006) ====
Morton's debut solo album NewClear was released on March 21, 2006, through Lyric Partners. The ten-track album featured a mix of original material and covers, running 37 minutes and 37 seconds. Morton explained his approach to the album in a 2006 Playbill interview: "These songs picked me. Ten years ago, Mark Underwood played me 'NewClear' and I loved it. For me, this album's about your environment and how it affects your place in this world and how it affects who we love and who loves us back." He was deliberate in creating a vocalist album rather than a musical theatre recording, stating: "A lot of my fans love Broadway, but I didn't want to make a musical theatre album." The album is dedicated "For Grandma 1931-1996 I miss you." The album included two songs by Boy George: "Pie in the Sky" and "Victims." Morton selected "Pie in the Sky" because he had "always loved it" and noted it was cut from the Broadway production of Taboo, calling it "a great radio song." The inclusion of "Victims" was suggested by Rosie O'Donnell and Kelly Carpenter. The album also featured Morton's version of Leonard Cohen's "Hallelujah," which he described as "probably the cut I'm proudest of, along with 'NewClear' and 'As It Began.'" The album was produced by Morton himself in association with David Nehls and Mae Robertson, with L. Lee Armitage serving as executive producer. Recording took place at Big Fat Suite Studio in New York City (recorded by Mark Grant) and Bias Recording in Springfield, Virginia (recorded and mixed by Bob Dawson). The album was mastered by UE Nastasi at Sterling Sound in New York City. The recording featured several musicians:

- Euan Morton – vocals, backing vocals
- David Nehls – piano, keyboard, Hammond B-3 organ
- David Matos – electric and acoustic guitars
- Paul Ranieri – electric and upright bass
- Damien Bassman – drums and percussion
- David Mann – saxophone
- Eleasha Gamble – backing vocals

Musical arrangements were by David Nehls, David Matos, Paul Ranieri, Damien Bassman and Euan Morton. Track listing for NewClear:

No.	Title	Writer(s)	Length
1.	"NewClear"	Mark Underwood	3:41
2.	"Closer & Closer"	Chris Judge, Greg Friel	4:30
3.	"Chelsea Hotel"	Dan Bern	3:55
4.	"Good Time Gone Bad"	David Nehls	3:14
5.	"Hallelujah"	Leonard Cohen	4:59
6.	"Victims"	Michael Craig, Roy Hay, Jonathan Moss, George O'Dowd	3:24
7.	"At This Moment"	William P. McCord	3:11
8.	"As It Began (A Lullaby)"	Mark Underwood	3:32
9.	"Pie in the Sky"	Kevan Frost, George O'Dowd	3:53
10.	"At This Moment (Watch Out For That Tree Mix)"	William P. McCord	3:34

Morton promoted the album with concerts at Joe's Pub in New York City on March 20 and April 3, 2006, and at Birdland on May 15, 2006, as part of their Spring Season. Morton's track "Hallelujah" was featured as part of Lufthansa's Radio Inflight Entertainment on all long-haul flights during September and October 2006.

==== Caledonia - The Homecoming (2011) ====
Morton's second album, Caledonia - The Homecoming, was released on May 10, 2011, through Lyric Partners. Described by Playbill as "an ode to Morton's homeland, Scotland," the album featured a mix of contemporary and traditional songs that pay tribute to Scotland. The album was preceded by Morton's cabaret performances in 2009, when he performed a Scottish-themed one-man show titled "Caledonia: Songs for the Homecoming" in New York City to mark Scotland's Year of the Homecoming. The album features traditional Scottish songs that Morton had learned as a child from his mother. In the album's liner notes, Morton explained that the project was inspired by overwhelming nostalgia during a planned trip home to Scotland. He wrote: "One is never more patriotic than when one is away from home. Distance also made me understand the true value of my upbringing in that beautiful, bucolic land." Morton described the album as "a chance to say 'thank you' to the place I will always call home. Thank you for making me Scottish." The album was produced by Morton himself alongside Bob Dawson, and recorded, mixed and mastered by Bob Dawson at Bias Studios in Springfield, Virginia. The recording featured several musicians: Jon Carroll on piano, accordion and Hammond organ; Jim Roberts on bass, guitar and mandolin; Christina Wheeler on violin; and Steve Fidyk on percussion. Morton acknowledged in the liner notes that not all songs are traditionally Scottish, explaining that some were included based on his personal associations with Scottish singers, particularly Eddi Reader. He stated: "I'm not trying to capture your idea of Caledonia — I'm here to share mine." Track listing for Caledonia - The Homecoming:

No.	Title	Writer(s)	Length
1.	"The Dark Island"	David Silver, Iain MacLauchlan	4:58
2.	"My Love Is Like a Red, Red Rose"	Robert Burns	3:19
3.	"Loch Lomond"	Traditional	3:22
4.	"Ae Fond Kiss"	Robert Burns	3:55
5.	"Kiteflyers' Hill"	Mark E. Nevin	4:53
6.	"Bell, Book and Candle"	Boo Hewerdine	4:46
7.	"Danny Boy"	Frederic Weatherly	3:41
8.	"Mull of Kintyre"	Paul McCartney, Denny Laine	4:33
9.	"Auld Lang Syne"	Robert Burns	4:12
10.	"Caledonia"	Dougie MacLean	5:22

To promote the album, Morton performed a concert on May 29, 2011, at Birdland in Manhattan as part of the Broadway at Birdland concert series.

== Personal life ==
Morton's son Iain made his debut as an internet theatre critic, where he reviews Broadway shows and has conducted Red Carpet interviews for SiriusXM before the 2015 Tony Awards. Iain played the title character in the television show Young Sheldon.

== Filmography ==
Year	Title	Role	Notes
1999	Captain Jack	1st Reporter	
2007	ShowBusiness: The Road to Broadway	Himself	
2009	My Dog Tulip	Bicyclist / Rude Veterinarian	Voice role
2015	The Night Before	Coat Check Patron	

== Theatre credits ==
Year	Production	Role	Theatre/Location	Type	Notes
1997	Approaching Zanzibar	Fletcher St. John/Amy Childs	Southwark Playhouse, London	Play	
1998	An Empty Plate in the Café du Grand Bœuf	Antoine	New End Theatre, London	Play	
1998	The Sexual Life of the Camel	Kevin	Man in the Moon Theatre, London	Play	
1999	The Matchstalk Man	Terry	Tristan Bates Theatre, London	Play	
1999	Bad Omens	Gabriel, Ben and Polyzaphocrates A Pixie	Upstairs at the Gatehouse, London	Play	
2001	The Silent Treatment	Andy	Finborough Theatre, London	Play	
2002–2003	Taboo	Boy George	Venue Theatre, West End	Musical	Olivier Award nomination for Best Actor in a Musical; originated role
2003–2004	Taboo	Boy George	Plymouth Theatre, Broadway	Musical	Tony Award nomination for Best Actor in a Musical; Theatre World Award
2004	Caligula: An Ancient Glam Epic	Caligula	New York Musical Theatre Festival	Musical	NYMF Award for Outstanding Individual Performance
2005–2006	Brundibár	Brundibár	Berkeley Rep/Yale Rep/New Victory Theater	Musical/Opera	Tony Kushner adaptation
2006	Measure for Pleasure	Molly Tawdry	The Public Theater, New York	Play	Obie Award for Outstanding Performance
2006	The Who's Tommy	Tommy	Bay Street Theatre, Sag Harbor, NY	Musical	
2007	Howard Katz	Robin and Ricky Barnes	Roundabout Theatre Company, New York	Play	With Alfred Molina
2007–2008	Cyrano de Bergerac	Lignière, Théophraste Renaudot	Richard Rodgers Theatre, Broadway	Play	Revival
2009	Leaves of Glass	Barry	Peter Jay Sharp Theater, New York	Play	
2009	Into the Woods	Narrator	Kansas City Repertory Theatre, Kansas City	Musical	
2010	Chess	Anatoly Sergievsky	Signature Theatre, Arlington, VA	Musical	
2010	Sondheim on Sondheim	Performer	Studio 54, Broadway	Musical Revue	
2011	Parade	Leo Frank	Ford's Theatre, Washington, D.C.	Musical	Helen Hayes Award for Outstanding Lead Actor
2012	The Two Gentlemen of Verona	Launce	Shakespeare Theatre Company	Play	
2012	Divine Rivalry	Michelangelo Buonarroti	The Old Globe Theatre, San Diego	Play	
2013	Stones in his Pockets	Charlie Conlon	Yale Repertory Theatre, NewHaven	Play	
2013	Hapgood	Ridley	Williamstown Theatre Festival, Williamstown	Play	
2013	The Film Society	Jonathon Balton	Clurman Theatre at Theatre Row, New York	Play	
2013	Being Earnest	Algernon Moncrieff	Mountain View Center for the Performing Arts, Mountain View	Musical	
2014	Atomic	J. Robert Oppenheimer	Acorn Theatre, New York	Musical	
2014–2015	The Heart of Robin Hood	Prince John	Royal Manitoba Theatre Centre/Bluma Appel Theatre, Toronto	Play	
2015	Baskerville: A Sherlock Holmes Mystery	Sherlock Holmes	Old Globe Theatre, San Diego, CA	Play	
2016	New York Spectacular Starring The Radio City Rockettes	Mercury (the statue)	Radio City Music Hall	Musical	
2016	Cake Off	Paul	Bucks County Playhouse, New Hope	Musical	
2016–2017	Hedwig and the Angry Inch	Hedwig	U.S. National Tour	Musical	
2017–2023	Hamilton	King George III	Richard Rodgers Theatre, Broadway	Musical	Longest-running actor in the role; replacement
2025	Ceilidh	Leo	M&T Bank Exchange, Baltimore	Musical	

=== Television ===
Year	Title	Role	Notes
2000	London's Burning	Davie	2 episodes
2000	Taggart	Bobby	Episode: "Wavelength"
2000	The Knock	Colin Hunter	1 episode
2000	The Bill	Fraser	2 episodes
2000–01	Something in the Air	Swampy	2 episodes
2008	Great Performances	Lingniere	Episode: "Cyrano de Bergerac"
2012	Outside the Box	Travis Bickle	Episode: "Taxi Driver"
2016	The Good Wife	Ivr Bircher	Episode: "Verdict"

=== Video games ===
Year	Title	Role	Notes
2011	Star Wars: The Old Republic	Sith Inquisitor Male / Additional Voices	
2013	Star Wars: The Old Republic	Sith Inquisitor Male	Expansion: "Rise of the Hutt Cartel"
2014	Star Wars: The Old Republic	Sith Inquisitor Male	Expansion: "Shadow of Revan"
2015	Star Wars: The Old Republic	Sith Inquisitor Male	Expansion: "Knights of the Fallen Empire"
2016	Star Wars: The Old Republic	Sith Inquisitor Male	Expansion: "Knights of the Eternal Throne"
2019	Star Wars: The Old Republic	Sith Inquisitor Male	Expansion: "Onslaught"
2022	Star Wars: The Old Republic	Sith Inquisitor Male	Expansion: "Legacy of the Sith"

== Awards and nominations ==
Awards and nominations
Year	Award	Category	Nominated work	Result	Ref.
2026	Kirkus Earphones Award	Thriller & Suspense	Wolf Hour by Jo Nesbø	Won	
2025	Earphones Award	Children	Max in the Land of Lies by Adam Gidwitz	Won	
2024	Good Housekeeping Award	Best kids' book	Max in the House of Spies by Adam Gidwitz	Won	
2023	Earphones Award	Fantasy	The Will of the Many by James Islington	Won	
2022	Audie Award	History/Biography	Somersett: Benjamin Franklin and the Masterminding of American Independence by Phillip Goodrich (multi-voiced)	Nominated	
2021	Earphones Award	History	Somersett: Benjamin Franklin and the Masterminding of American Independence by Phillip Goodrich (multi-voiced)	Won	
2021	Earphones Award	Young Adult Ages 14+	Any Way the Wind Blows by Rainbow Rowell	Won	
2021	Voice Arts Awards	Audiobook narration – Mystery – Best voiceover	The Kingdom by Jo Nesbo	Nominated	
2021	Voice Arts Awards	Audiobook narration – History – Best voiceover	Somersett: Benjamin Franklin and the Masterminding of American Independence by Phillip Goodrich	Nominated	
2020	Audie Award	Multi-voiced Performance	Dooku: Jedi Lost (Star Wars) by Cavan Scott	Nominated	
2020	Earphones Award	Fantasy	Shakespeare for Squirrels by Christopher Moore (author)	Won	
2019	Earphones Award	Young Adult Ages 14+	Wayward Son by Rainbow Rowell	Won	
2019	Earphones Award	Fiction	Inland by Téa Obreht (multi-voiced)	Won	
2019	Audie Award	Best Male Narrator	The Devil's Half Mile by Paddy Hirsch	Nominated	
2019	Audie Award	Thriller/Suspense	Crimson Lake by Candice Fox	Won	
2019	Audie Award	Thriller/Suspense	Macbeth by Jo Nesbø	Nominated	
2018	IRNE Award	Best Visiting Actor	Hedwig and the Angry Inch at the Boch Center	Nominated	
2016	Audie Award	Middle Grade	The Enchanted Files: Diary of a Mad Brownie by Bruce Coville	Nominated	
2015	Earphones Award	Children Ages 8+	The Enchanted Files: Diary of a Mad Brownie by Bruce Coville	Won	
2015	Earphones Award	Young Adult	Carry On by Rainbow Rowell	Won	
2012	Helen Hayes Award	Outstanding Lead Actor, Resident Musical	Parade at Ford's Theatre	Won	
2009	Bistro Award	Outstanding Vocalist	Performance at the Metropolitan Room	Won	
2008	Earphones Award	Science fiction	Dune	Won	
2008	Audie Award	Science fiction	Dune	Won	
2008	Audie Award	Achievement in production	Dune	Nominated	
2006	Drama League Award	Distinguished Performance	Measure for Pleasure	Nominated	
2006	Obie Award	Performance	Measure for Pleasure	Won	
2004	Tony Award for Best Actor in a Musical	Best Actor in a Musical	Taboo	Nominated	
2004	Drama Desk Award for Outstanding Actor in a Musical	Outstanding Actor in a Musical	Taboo	Nominated	
2004	Drama League Award	Distinguished Performance	Taboo	Nominated	
2004	Outer Critics Circle Award	Outstanding Actor in a Musical	Taboo	Nominated	
2004	Theatre Fans' Choice Award	—	Taboo	Nominated	
2004	NYMF Award	Outstanding Individual Performance	Caligula	Won	
2004	Theatre World Award	Outstanding Broadway Debut	Taboo	Won	
2003	Laurence Olivier Award for Best Actor in a Musical	Best Actor in a Musical or Entertainment	Taboo (West End)	Nominated	
2003	Whatsonstage Award	Best Actor in a Musical	Taboo (West End)	Nominated	
