= Attachment =

Attachment may refer to:

== Art and entertainment ==
- Attachment (painting), an 1829 work by Edwin Landseer
- Attachment (film), a 2023 Danish horror film by Gabriel Bier Gislason
- Attachments (novel), a 2011 novel by Rainbow Rowell
- Attachments (TV series), a BBC comedy-drama that ran from 2000 to 2002

== Law ==
- Attachment (law), a means of collecting a legal judgment by levying on a specific property in the possession of the opposing party.
- Attachment of earnings, collecting money owed by a debtor directly from the debtor's employer
- Rule B Attachment, provided under the US Federal Rules of Civil Procedure for freezing a defendant's property in pursuit of a maritime claim

== Technology ==
- Ball attachment (dentistry), a dental implant component
- Excavator attachment added onto construction equipment to alter its function
- Pilot (train attachment), a cowcatcher
- Rental attachments, components attached to rental machinery

=== Computing ===
- AT (Advanced Technology) Attachment, a computer disk drive interface standard more commonly known as PATA (Parallel ATA) and SATA (Serial Advanced Technology Attachment)
- Email attachment, a computer electronic mail feature

== Other ==
- Attachment theory, psychological model attempting to describe the dynamics of relationships between humans
- The binding of a virus to its target cell
- Moh, a vice in Sikh religion
- Upādāna, a cause of suffering in Buddhism
