= Fan Girl =

Fan Girl may refer to:

- Fan Girl (2015 film), an American teen comedy film
- Fan Girl (2020 film), a Philippine coming-of-age drama film

== See also ==
- Fangirl
- Fangirl (novel), a 2013 novel by Rainbow Rowell
- Fangirls (musical), a 2019 musical by Yve Blake
