= Wayward Son (novel) =

2019 novel by Rainbow Rowell

- Author: Rainbow Rowell
- Cover artist: Kevin Wada
- Language: English
- Series: The Simon Snow Series
- Genre: Urban Fantasy
- Publisher: Wednesday Books
- Publication date: September 2019
- Publication place: United States
- Media type: print, audiobook
- Pages: 368
- ISBN: 978-1-250-14607-6
- Preceded by: Carry On
- Followed by: Any Way the Wind Blows

Wayward Son is the fourth young adult novel written by Rainbow Rowell, published in 2019. The story follows Simon Snow and his friends a year and a half after the end of the first book of the trilogy, Carry On. It explores their young adult lives and how they navigate them now that Simon destroyed the biggest threat to the World of Mages, the universe's British sect of magic. The group finds themselves in the United States under the guise of visiting their friend, Agatha, in California, but the story takes the characters on a road trip filled with cryptids, self-discovery, and a new friend. The story is narrated by multiple characters.

The novel is the second book in the Simon Snow trilogy, which is a spinoff of the novel Fangirl.

== Plot ==
Wayward Son opens about a year and a half after Simon Snow's final showdown with the humdrum and shows that a lot has changed since he fell from grace as the "Chosen One".

The story is narrated by multiple characters, including Simon, Baz, Agatha and Penny. There are interludes from new characters as well, including Shepard.

Wayward Son begins with Penelope wanting a change of scene. She suggests that they go to the United States for a holiday to visit Agatha, who now lives in California. Agatha tells them not to since she will be out of town at a NowNext retreat for members and guests. (It is unknown at this time, but NowNext is also known as NextBlood, a vampire cult.) It is also in an attempt to bring Simon out of his shell, as he has become obviously depressed. The group leaves for the United States after their final exams. Penny breaks up with her boyfriend as soon as they arrive in Chicago, which leaves her undecided and without a plan. The group looks to Penny for guidance, so everyone believes it is a bad idea to be in America now that she has no real will to continue on. Nonetheless, they continue on their way to California.

On their way through the Midwest and towards California, they stop at a renaissance faire in Nebraska. While there, they kill a handful of vampires reigning terror on innocent people. After killing these vampires very publicly, they escape. During their time in the faire, they broke several magick laws; Penny constantly is convinced that she will be severely punished by her mother, who is now the Headmistress at Watford School of Magicks. After a few hours of driving, Simon notices a car following them. They drive until their car breaks down; they find themselves in a Quiet Zone, or a place where there is no magic due to the lack of "Normals" (non-magical people) in the area. The car following them pulls over as well, and the man that gets out introduces himself as Shepard; Baz notices him because Shepard gave him an American spell that helped them defeat the vampires. Simon, Baz, and Penny do not take too kindly to Shepard until he saves them from American cryptids that rule over the quiet zones. They get away in Shepard's truck and find a motel. There is a recurring theme of Simon, Baz, and Penny trying to erase Shepard's memories and leaving him behind and Shepard catching up to save them from American cryptids. They eventually allow Shepard to join their group and they forge on together.

After a distressing voice message from Agatha, the group is more determined to find her. Because of Shepard's connections, they are able to find some answers from a water spirit in the Hoover Dam named Blue. To find out more about the NowNext, or NextBlood (a group of self-made vampires), she tells them to go towards The Katherine, a hotel in Las Vegas. They follow her directions and find that they have walked right into a vampire haven. Baz goes undercover to dig up more information and is quickly intercepted by a vampire named Lamb. The plan was to get as much information as possible, but it turns into a test to determine if Baz is one of the NowNext. He does not collect all the information he needs that night because of it, but they meet again and Lamb tells Baz everything he knows. While trying to obtain this information, Baz has to show his way of living as it is not typical for a normal vampire's and is nothing like NowNext. They go back to the Katherine, where the group joins Baz. After some harsh conversation, Lamb, whom the group learns is the vampire Governor of the US, leads them to the NextBlood so they can rescue Agatha.

By the time they reach the lab where they work, Shepard is asleep and Penny and Simon learn that they are in a Quiet Zone. Chaos ensues and Baz learns that Lamb has a duty to hand over mages to the NextBlood to keep the peace. Instead of peace, Simon, Baz, and Penny are ready to fight. They are able to defeat the NowNext vampires using magic, Baz killing the leader, due to the Burning Man festival. They escape and head back to San Diego. They spend a few days there and, in that time, Penny learns that a demon cursed Shepard while Simon tries to break up with Baz. The story ends with Penny alerting the group that there is an emergency back at home and they have to leave right away.

== Main characters ==
=== Simon Snow ===
Simon Snow is the protagonist of this story. He still has the red dragon wings and devil tail he gave himself in Carry On and is described as laying on the couch all day, drinking ciders, watching day-time television, and eating. He has since dropped out of university and stopped visiting his therapist. Penny and Baz collectively care for Simon, but because of his loss of magic, their constant use of it starts making him grumpy and distant. However, as the story progresses, he comes out of his shell and tries to save the day again. Regardless of his growth, his tether to Baz, his boyfriend, starts to unwind.

=== Tyrannus Basilton "Baz" Grimm-Pitch the Third ===
Baz is the second protagonist of the story and is also Simon's boyfriend. Baz's growth and self-realization throughout the story are prevalent themes. As mages shame and sometimes kill vampires in the United Kingdom, Baz sees a side of vampirism he never expected. He learns about the ways of American vampires, which also allows him to learn more about himself. However, the distance between Simon and Baz grows ever larger as he starts to take to Lamb for advice.

=== Penelope "Penny" Bunce ===
Penny is Simon's best friend. She instigates the trip to the United States, saying she wants to visit Agatha because she seems withdrawn.

=== Shepard ===
Shepard is a "Normal" (non-magical) person without a last name. He is an acquaintance whom Simon, Baz, and Penny meet during their road trip from Chicago to California. He has an odd link to cryptids and mages, which Penny, Simon, and Baz, find out later has landed him in trouble. Because of his interest in magical beings, he has been cursed by a demon.

=== Lamb ===
Lamb is a vampire whom Baz meets at a vampire club while investigating in Las Vegas. He provides Baz with information that allows him to understand his vampirism a bit more, but as governor of the vampires, Lamb hands Simon and Penny over to the NextBlood in order to maintain peace.

== Sequel ==
Wayward Son is the second part of the Simon Snow trilogy, with Any Way the Wind Blows (2021) being its sequel.

== Reception ==
Wayward Son received generally positive reviews from critics. NPR's Caitlyn Paxson described it as "a very enjoyable read, rendered even more fun than its predecessor by the fact that it isn't encumbered by its inspirational material." She continued by discussing how author Rainbow Rowell demonstrated her ability to develop characters who are not as similar to Harry Potter characters such as Draco Malfoy and the titular Harry Potter. Vox reporter Constance Grady agrees that the story is much like Harry Potter, but praises Carry On's fanfiction-esque qualities, noting "it's enormous fun to read, a delirious candy-coated romp of a book that you can devour in a single evening."

However, Grady argues that the book pales in comparison to its predecessor. She states that "Wayward Son was bound to be a slighter book than Carry On is. It can't pull off the same trick that Carry On did because that trick only works once. It can't turn fanon into canon for the first time all over again." Additionally, Paxson further brings up the question of colonizer magic versus indigenous magic and how Rowell barely touches on the idea. She notes, "A sprawling road trip book about the nature of magic in America runs inherently up against a dilemma: Is it responsible to create a vision of American magic that only represents its colonizers and immigrants?" Paxson expresses her desire that there was some sort of deeper type of understanding of and information about indigenous magic to reinforce that indigenous cultures are alive, but notes that Rowell's avoidance of the topic may also be a safe way to avoid possible cultural appropriation.

The general public's reception of Wayward Son did not match its predecessor, but Grady describes the readers' relationship with the series as a "drive from its characters and from the reader's desire to spend time with those characters."

Wayward Son won the 2019 Barnes & Noble Booksellers' Favorites in Young Adult Books. It was also nominated for the Goodreads Choice Award Nominee for Young Adult Fantasy & Science Fiction (2019) and was included on the American Library Association's "2020 YALSA Teens' Top Ten Titles". The audiobook, narrated by Euan Morton, received an AudioFile Earphones Award in 2019.
