= Landline (novel) =

2014 sci-fi novel by Rainbow Rowell

- First US edition (publ. St Martins Press)
- Author: Rainbow Rowell
- Language: English
- Publisher: St. Martin's Press
- Publication date: 2014
- Dewey Decimal: 813.6
- LC Class: PS3618.O8755 L36

Landline is a 2014 American sci-fi novel by Rainbow Rowell. It tells the story of 37-year-old Georgie McCool who discovers that she is able to call her husband's 22-year-old self through his landline. Rowell stated that aspects from the novel are loosely based on her own life such as the fact that Georgie is incredibly career-driven while her husband is a stay-at-home dad. The character of Georgie McCool was named after the song Georgy Girl and the village of McCool Junction.

While the novel has sci-fi themes akin to time travel, these are used mostly as a plot device to describe the hardships of adult life and the crumbling marriage of main character Georgie McCool.

== Plot ==
In 2013 Georgie McCool, a 37-year-old sitcom writer, tells her husband Neal she will not be able to spend Christmas with his mother in Omaha, Nebraska, as she and her writing partner, Seth, have just gotten a writing assignment for four scripts for a mid-season pickup and have only ten days to deliver. Georgie suggests that she and Neal visit his mother after the holidays but Neal decides to leave for Christmas anyway, taking their two young daughters with him.

Neal is notoriously closed off but even so Georgie senses that he is angry at her as he leaves. Georgie asks him to call her when he lands.

In the writer's room Georgie and her writing partner Seth, whom she has been best friends with since college, attempt to write the pilot for their show which they have been working on for as long as they have known each other. After working all day and missing a call from Neal, Georgie goes home to her mother's house where her mother believes she has been dumped by Neal. Georgie calls Neal's mother's house from the landline and talks to him briefly.

The following day they talk again and through the conversation Georgie realizes that she is talking to a 22-year-old Neal back in 1998. Georgie begins to reflect back on their relationship. Georgie was initially joined at the hip with Seth and the two were co-writers for the ULA college humor magazine The Spoon. After several months of working there, Georgie noticed Neal, who worked as a cartoonist for the paper, and became attracted to him. Much to Seth's jealousy, Georgie and Neal began a flirtation that developed into a relationship. One Christmas, shortly before she graduated they had a fight and Neal left for Omaha. Upon his return Neal abruptly proposed to Georgie. Georgie eventually realizes that she is talking to Neal during their break.

Initially believing she is having a nervous breakdown, Georgie nevertheless continues to talk to past-Neal especially since she is unable to reach the Neal of the present who refuses to answer his phone. The two discuss their relationship and, based on the conversations they have, Georgie realizes that what she is currently saying might have caused Neal to propose to her in the past. Reflecting that to propose to her Neal drove 27 hours straight from Omaha to Los Angeles, Georgie forgoes her writing with Seth and gets on a plane to spend Christmas with her family. In Omaha Georgie is stuck at the airport due to a heavy snowfall. She is given a ride to Neal's mother's house by Cather and Levi [Fangirl], who make a cameo appearance (we learn here that Cather is engaged). Though she is afraid that her conversations with past-Neal might have erased their future together and their children, she is pleasantly surprised to see her family intact when she arrives. She and Neal make up and resolve to work on their future together.

== Reception ==
Although Landline is an adult novel in the style of Attachments, it has a very adolescent vibe to it, in characteristic Rowell fashion. The book has won Goodreads Choice Awards for Best Fiction Book of the Year, and has been featured on both Amazon and Kobo's Best Book of the Year lists.

The novel received mixed reviews. NPR called it "funny, clever, charming, endearing," while noting it paled in comparison to Rowell's other books. The New York Times gave the book a positive review calling Rowell "talented enough to be uncategorizable".

The book also received attention from Canadian publication The Globe and Mail who described it as "more than okay," and referred to it as a young adult novel.
