= Oh, Mary! =

2024 play by Cole Escola

- Original Broadway windowcard, photo by Daniel Rampulla
- Original language: English
- Written by: Cole Escola
- Characters: Mary Todd Lincoln; Mary's Husband; Mary's Chaperone; Mary's Husband's Assistant; Mary's Teacher
- Genre: Comedy
- Setting: White House, Washington, D.C., 1865

Premiere
- Date: February 8, 2024
- Place: Lucille Lortel Theatre
- Official website

Oh, Mary! is a comedy play written and originally performed by American comedian Cole Escola. The show opened on Broadway on July 11, 2024, at the Lyceum Theatre, transferring from its off-Broadway run at the Lucille Lortel Theatre, earning critical acclaim and being named a finalist for the Pulitzer Prize for Drama. The show was nominated for five Tony Awards, winning Best Direction of a Play as well as Best Actor in a Play for Escola, the first non-binary winner in the category. The West End production won the Laurence Olivier Award for Best Entertainment or Comedy Play in 2026.

== Synopsis ==
The play is a spoof of the lives of Abraham Lincoln and Mary Todd Lincoln. It is set in the days leading up to Lincoln's assassination, which occurred while he and Mary were watching Our American Cousin at Ford's Theatre. The show portrays Mary as a temperamental alcoholic, stuck in an unhappy marriage with the deeply closeted President Lincoln and desperate to return to her past glory days as a cabaret star. The title is taken from a slang phrase used among gay men going back decades.

== Plot summary ==
In April 1865, First Lady Mary Todd Lincoln's husband struggles to cope with both the close of the Civil War and his erratic, alcoholic wife. After he and his meek assistant Simon fail to hide a bottle of whiskey from her in the Oval Office, he forces Mary to take painting lessons with her constantly abused and ridiculed chaperone Louise, despite Mary demanding to return to her lifelong passion of performing in cabaret. Sometime later, she returns to the Oval Office passed out, having consumed a bucket of paint thinner; she is awoken by the phrase, "Places, Ms. Todd!"

Now forbidden from painting lessons, she and Louise take up cross-stitching. Louise encourages her to find enjoyment in her life outside of cabaret, and Mary asks what Louise would do if she had no concerns or obligations in life. After hesitating, she confides in Mary that she would want nothing more than to "enjoy" ice cream, after it one day fell on her lap and aroused her. Her Husband enters to announce the end of the war and Mary immediately blurts out her secret, betraying Louise, though he dismisses it.

Meanwhile, Her Husband -- who is deeply closeted -- struggles to decide how to rebuild the country and looks to Simon, now his mistress, for help. During an office tryst, he decides to provide Mary with acting lessons to keep her from drinking. He hires a down-on-his-luck acting Teacher to introduce her to the world of William Shakespeare. After trial and error, she begins to take it on well, and after her Teacher confesses his love, they kiss; Louise secretly witnesses it. The couple devise a plan for Mary to audition for a recently opened part in the upcoming Ford's Theatre production of Our American Cousin, following which it would go on tour and the two would elope in Canada. Mary's audition goes awry when she improvises the role of Nurse from Romeo & Juliet but declares it went well and sneaks off to a local saloon to celebrate. Louise tells Mary's Husband of the tryst, eliciting no concerned reaction.

At the saloon, Mary hides when her Husband arrives, and shortly after her Teacher as well, for a secret meeting. It is revealed that after her Husband hired the Teacher to keep her from drinking, the Teacher fabricated the audition to placate her. After it seemed to have worked, the Teacher proposes that he and her Husband rekindle their long term, on-off romance, but her Husband ends the relationship. Heartbroken, the Teacher threatens to out him, but he remains defiant and exits the saloon. The Teacher chases after him in desperation and Mary is left despondent. A few days later, at the opening of Our American Cousin, Mary and her Husband watch the play as usual. The Teacher shows up in their booth and moves Mary out of her seat to get on his knees to beg her Husband to take him back; Mary pulls a gun and shoots her Husband, drops the gun in his hand, and leaves. The Teacher leaps from the box and runs offstage through the audience.

In the near future, Mary and Simon launch a traveling cabaret show, in which Mary performs a "madcap medley" of some of the actor playing Mary's favorite tunes.

== Production history ==
=== Off-Broadway (2024) ===
Under the direction of Sam Pinkleton, the play premiered Off-Broadway at the Lucille Lortel Theatre on February 8, 2024, with previews beginning January 26, 2024. The show had a planned closing date of March 24, 2024; however, due to high ticket sales and critical acclaim, the play extended twice, first from March 24 until May 2, and then until May 12.

Promotional poster for the original 1939 Broadway production of The Little Foxes, the design of which is closely referenced by the Oh, Mary! poster

The main poster and Playbill design (yellow background with red and black lettering and the tagline "The Greatest Play of the Generation" over a circular photo of the lead performer in character) used for both the off-Broadway and Broadway productions of Oh, Mary! is a close reference to the promotional design for the original production of Lillian Hellman's 1939 play The Little Foxes.

=== Broadway (2024–present) ===
On April 24, 2024, producers announced the show would transfer to Broadway for a limited run at the Lyceum Theatre. The Broadway production marked Escola's Broadway debut as both a performer and playwright. Previews began on June 26, with a run originally scheduled from July 11 to September 15. However, on July 23, 2024, due to popular demand, it was announced the show would extend its run through November 10. On September 19, 2024, it was announced the show would extend through January 19, 2025. The show features original music by Daniel Kluger and arrangements by David Dabbon. Scenic design is by the design collective known as dots with costumes by Holly Pierson and Astor Yang (original off-Broadway production costumes for Cole Escola.). In December 2024, the run of Oh, Mary! was extended a third time to June 28, 2025, and Betty Gilpin was cast as Mary, replacing Escola. Subsequently Phillip James Brannon replaced Conrad Ricamora as Mary's Husband and Chris Renfro replaced James Scully as Mary's Teacher.

Tituss Burgess replaced Gilpin for a temporary engagement in March 2025. Escola rejoined the cast on April 8, 2025, as did Ricamora and Scully. Days after the 2025 Tony Nominations, ticket sales were extended to September 28, 2025 and Burgess was once again to replace Escola as Mary in a limited 6-week engagement to begin in June. Following Burgess's second run in the production, Oh, Mary was repeatedly extended and the role of Mary was recast several times with other notable performers playing the character in limited runs. The role has since been played on Broadway by performer Jinkx Monsoon, who also performed over two runs, actress Jane Krakowski, understudy Hannah Solow, actor and director John Cameron Mitchell, actress Maya Rudolph, actress Megan Stalter, and actor Bowen Yang, who has been in the role since September 15, 2026. Replacements in other roles include Kumail Nanjiani, Brannon and John-Andrew Morrison as Mary's Husband, Michael Urie, Cheyenne Jackson, Simu Liu and Barrett Foa as Mary's Teacher, Jenn Harris as Mary's Chaperone, and Ryo Kambiashi as Mary's Husband's Assistant.

=== West End (2025–26) ===
On October 2, the show's producers announced the production would transfer to London for its West End premiere at the Trafalgar Theatre. The production began previews on December 3, with an official opening on December 18, 2025, originally set to run until April 25, 2026. Pinkleton is set to return as the director with Mason Alexander Park starring as Mary. Also starring in the cast are Giles Terera as Mary's Husband, with Kate O'Donnell as Mary's Chaperone, Oliver Stockley as Mary's Husband's Assistant, and Dino Fetscher as Mary's Teacher. The show extended to July 2026 with Catherine Tate and Scott Karim set to replace Park and Terera. Tate prematurely left the role due to personal reasons, where Park returned to reprise the role for two weeks before her original departure date. On May 26, 2026, Escola was announced to be returning to the role, making their West-End debut and succeeding Tate, for a four week engagement. It was later announced that the show would be filmed during Escola’s run, with previous cast members including Macht, Leigh, Urie and Terera confirmed to return for the filming.

=== U.S. tour (2026) ===
In January 2026, the producers of Oh, Mary! announced that the play would go on a national tour starting in late 2026, premiering in Hartford, Connecticut. The tour will also include performances in Boston, Chicago, Las Vegas, Los Angeles, Philadelphia, San Francisco, and Washington, D.C..

The cast includes RuPaul's Drag Race All Stars season 2 winner Alaska Thunderfuck as Mary Todd Lincoln, John-Andrew Morrison as Mary's Husband, Wesley Taylor as Mary's Teacher, Pooya Mohseni as Mary's Chaperone, and Michael Lepore as Mary's Husband's Assistant. Thunderfuck is set to play the titular role at touring venues through January 17, 2027. J. Harrison Ghee was originally set to play Mary's Husband opposite Thunderfuck before replacing her in the role of Mary opposite John-Andrew Morrison as Mary's Husband, making them the first performer to play both Mary and Mary's Husband. Before performances began, Ghee was forced to leave the tour for medical reasons, with Morrison joining the tour early to perform as Mary's Husband opposite Thunderfuck. It was later announced that Ghee would be forced to leave the tour permanently, with Morrison permanently taking over as Mary's Husband and casting for Mary after Thunderfuck's departure to be announced.

== Original cast and characters ==
Character	Off-Broadway	Broadway	West End	North American Tour
Character	2024		2025	2026
Mary Todd Lincoln	Cole Escola	Cole Escola	Mason Alexander Park	Alaska Thunderfuck
Mary's Husband	Conrad Ricamora	Conrad Ricamora	Giles Terera	John-Andrew Morrison
Mary's Chaperone (Louise)	Bianca Leigh	Bianca Leigh	Kate O'Donnell	Pooya Mohseni
Mary's Husband's Assistant (Simon)	Tony Macht	Tony Macht	Oliver Stockley	Michael Lepore
Mary's Teacher	James Scully	James Scully	Dino Fetscher	Wesley Taylor

=== Notable replacements ===
==== Broadway (2024–) ====
- Mary Todd Lincoln: Betty Gilpin, Tituss Burgess, Jinkx Monsoon, Jane Krakowski, John Cameron Mitchell, Maya Rudolph, Megan Stalter, Bowen Yang
- Mary's Husband: Kumail Nanjiani
- Mary's Teacher: Michael Urie, Cheyenne Jackson, Simu Liu, Barrett Foa

==== West End (2025–) ====
- Mary Todd Lincoln: Catherine Tate, Cole Escola, Jinkx Monsoon, Lolly Adefope, Jane Krakowski

== Critical reception ==
Joshua Barone of The New York Times described it as "silly, nasty, tasteless and, in the end, good theater." He described how the play stretches a "stupid joke" to its limits but still leaves audiences "gagging" with laughter.

Amelia Merrill of the New York Theatre Guide emphasized the campy, irreverent nature of Oh, Mary!, calling it both absurd and heartwarming. She pointed out how Escola's reinterpretation of Mary Todd Lincoln, though not historically accurate, explored the First Lady's mental health struggles through comedy. Jesse Green of The New York Times echoed these sentiments, noting the play's deft combination of camp and discipline. He praised the production for finding a balance between chaotic comedy and choreographed precision. Green also called it "one of the best crafted and most exactingly directed Broadway comedies in years" despite Escola's own admission that it's "the stupidest play."

Howard Miller of Talkin' Broadway emphasized the show's success in balancing a "queer-infused raucous, farcical, campy" energy while maintaining emotional depth beneath its absurdity. Sara Holdren wrote for Vulture that "Oh, Mary! is hilarious and, underneath the mayhem, both structurally rock solid and sneakily moving", while a Variety reviewer described the play as "a broad, wildly funny comedy" that was also irreverent. TheWrap wrote: "Escola has somehow managed to turn the assassination of President Abraham Lincoln into an inspired, rollicking comedy." Adam Feldman, for Time Out New York, gave Oh, Mary! a five-star rating, saying that the play "is dizzyingly, breathtakingly funny, the kind of funny that ambushes your body into uncontained laughter."

However not all reviews were positive, with critic Michael Sommers writing for New York Stage Review giving the play 2 out of 5 stars describing the script as "flimsy" adding it's more of "a ribald cartoon more hysterical than historical".

== Awards and nominations ==
=== 2024 Off-Broadway production ===
Year	Award	Category	Nominee	Result	Ref.
2024	Drama League Award	Outstanding Production of a Play		Nominated	
2024	Drama League Award	Outstanding Direction of a Play	Sam Pinkleton	Nominated	
2024	Drama League Award	Distinguished Performance	Cole Escola	Nominated	
2024	Drama League Award	Distinguished Performance	Conrad Ricamora	Nominated	
2024	Off-Broadway Alliance Awards	Best New Play		Won	
2024	Outer Critics Circle Awards	Outer Critics Circle John Gassner Award	Cole Escola	Won	
2024	Outer Critics Circle Awards	Outstanding Lead Performer in an Off-Broadway Play	Cole Escola	Won	
2024	Outer Critics Circle Awards	Outstanding Featured Performer in an Off-Broadway Play	Conrad Ricamora	Nominated	
2024	Drama Desk Awards	Sam Norkin Off-Broadway Award	Cole Escola	Won	
2024	Drama Desk Awards	Outstanding Featured Performance in a Play	Conrad Ricamora	Nominated	
2024	Theatre World Award		Cole Escola	Won	
2024	Obie Awards	Performance	Cole Escola	Won	
2024	Dorian Award	Outstanding Off-Broadway Production		Won	
2024	Dorian Award	Outstanding LGBTQ Off-Broadway Production		Won	
2024	Dorian Award	Outstanding Lead Performance in an Off-Broadway Production	Cole Escola	Won	
2024	Dorian Award	Outstanding Featured Performance in an Off-Broadway Production	Conrad Ricamora	Won	
2024	Dorian Award	Outstanding Featured Performance in an Off-Broadway Production	James Scully	Nominated	

=== 2024 Broadway production ===
Year	Award	Category	Nominee	Result	Ref.
2025	Tony Awards	Best Play		Nominated	
2025	Tony Awards	Best Actor in a Play	Cole Escola	Won	
2025	Tony Awards	Best Featured Actor in a Play	Conrad Ricamora	Nominated	
2025	Tony Awards	Best Direction of a Play	Sam Pinkleton	Won	
2025	Tony Awards	Best Costume Design of a Play	Holly Pierson	Nominated	
2025	Pulitzer Prize for Drama		Cole Escola	Finalist	
2025	GLAAD Media Awards	Outstanding Broadway Production		Won	
2025	Drama League Awards	Outstanding Production of a Play		Won	
2025	Drama League Awards	Outstanding Direction of a Play	Sam Pinkleton	Won	
2025	Drama League Awards	Distinguished Performance	Cole Escola	Nominated	
2025	New York Drama Critics' Circle Award	Special Citation	Cole Escola	Honored	
2026	Broadway.com Audience Awards	Favorite Replacement (Female)	Jane Krakowski	Nominated	

=== 2025 West End production ===
Year	Award	Category	Nominee	Result	Ref.
2026	Laurence Olivier Awards	Best Entertainment or Comedy Play		Won	
2026	Laurence Olivier Awards	Best Actor in a Supporting Role	Giles Terera	Nominated	

== See also ==
- Abe Lincoln in Illinois
- The Last of Mrs. Lincoln
- The Day Lincoln Was Shot
- Lincoln
- Assassins (musical)
- Cultural depictions of Abraham Lincoln
