= Anne L. Nathan =

American actress and singer

- Occupations: Actress; singer; musician; acting coach
- Years active: 1991–present

Anne L. Nathan is an American actress and singer known for her work on Broadway.

== Career ==
Anne L. Nathan made her Broadway debut in 1998 as Brigit in Ragtime. Other Broadway credits include: Funny Girl (Mrs. Straykosh) It Shoulda Been You as Aunt Sheila/Mimsy, Baruska in the Broadway musical Once, Roundabout Theater Company’s revival of Sunday in the Park with George playing Nurse, Mrs. and Harriet, Matron “Mama” Morton in Chicago, Emma Goldman in Assassins, Thoroughly Modern Millie (Miss Flannery) and Ragtime.

Off-Broadway: Singstreet at NYTW, Joe Iconis’s Broadway Bounty Hunter, Sun Down Yellow Moon (Ars Nova /Woman’s Project) Taming of the Shrew at The Delacorte (The Public Theater) Wings at 2ST; Marthe in the Encores! production of Music in the Air; Aunt Eva in Stephen Sondheim’s Road Show at The Public Theater; and Swingtime Canteen.

She has toured with the national companies of Chicago (Carbonell Award), Les Misérables and Aspects of Love.

Nathan’s regional credits include Mrs. Fezziwig in McCarter Theater’s A Christmas Carol, Lucienne in A Flea In Her Ear, at the Kansas City Repertory Theatre, She has played Charlotte in Falsettos at both George Street Playhouse and The Huntington Theatre Company. Other regional credits include productions at La Jolla Playhouse, Barrington Stage Company and The Asolo Theatre Recordings: Sing Street, It Shoulda Been You Once, Ragtime, Thoroughly Modern Millie, Assassins, Road Show, Out Of Context- The Songs of Michael Patrick Walker.

Nathan’s film and television credits include You Must Be Joking, Baby Mama, King of California, Fleishman Is In Trouble, Little America, Elementary, The Good Wife, Dirt, Law & Order (Trial by Jury, Special Victims Unit, and Criminal Intent), Veronica Mars, What I Like About You, and Bull. She has also been on Three Tony Award telecasts, Letterman, America’s Got Talent, The Today Show, and The Rosie O’Donnell Show. Nathan can be seen on the web series Submissions Only. (submissionsonly.com)

Nathan joined the Broadway company of Funny Girl in the role of Mrs. Strakosh on March 28th, 2023.

== Theatre credits ==
Source: Playbill

Year	Show	Role	Notes
Unknown	The Music Man	Alma Hicks	Citadel Theatre
Unknown	Les Misérables	Fantine (u/s)	National Tour
Unknown	Chicago	Matron "Mama" Morton (replacement)	Broadway
1991	Aspects of Love	Unknown	Elgin Theater
1995	Swingtime Canteen	Marian/Jo/Topeka	off-Broadway; Mar 14 – November 26, 1995
1997	Ragtime	Baron's Assistant/Brigit	Ford Theater
1998	Ragtime	Baron's Assistant/Brigit/Emma Goldman (u/s)	Broadway; January 18, 1998 – January 16, 2000
2000	Thoroughly Modern Millie	Miss Flannery	La Jolla Playhouse; Oct/Dec 2000
2002	Thoroughly Modern Millie	Miss Flannery	Broadway, 2002–04
2004	Assassins	Emma Goldman	Broadway, Apr 22 – July 18, 2004
2005	Falsettos	Dr. Charlotte	Huntington Theatre Company
2007	Falsettos	Dr. Charlotte	George Street Playhouse
2007	Music in the Air	Marthe	Encores!
2008	Sunday in the Park With George	Harriet Pawling/Mrs./Nurse	Broadway, Feb 21 – June 29, 2008
2008	Road Show	Aunt Eva	off-Broadway
2009	A Flea in Her Ear	Lucienne	Kansas Repertory Theatre
2010	Wings	Nurse	Off-Broadway; Oct 24 – November 21, 2010
2011	Once	Baruška	Off-Broadway
2012	Once	Baruška	Broadway, 2012–14
2014	Once	Baruška	A.R.T
2015	It Shoulda Been You	Mimsy/Aunt Sheila	Broadway, Apr 14 – August 9, 2015
2023	Funny Girl	Mrs. Strakosh	Broadway, March 28, 2023 – 2023
2025	Ceilidh	Granny/Maria	M&T Bank Exchange, Baltimore, September 10 - October 12, 2025

== Filmography ==
Source: Internet Movie Database

=== Film ===
Year	Title	Role	Notes
2007	King of California	Applebee's Manager	
2008	Baby Mama	Book Store Clerk	
2010	Random Unrelated Projects	Joy	
2014	Are You Joking?	Mrs. Farrow	

=== Television ===
Year	Title	Role	Notes
2003	Law & Order: Special Victims Unit	Volunteer No. 1	1 episode
2003	Law & Order: Criminal Intent	Robin Ingles	1 episode
2005	Law & Order: Trial By Jury	Audrey Golum	2 episodes
2005	What I Like About You	Auction Lady	1 episode
2006	Veronica Mars	Blind Date No. 2	1 episode
2007	Law & Order: Criminal Intent	Dr. Stern	1 episode
2007–08	Dirt	Dr. Shelba	2 episodes
2008	As the World Turns	Ginny	1 episode
2010–14	Submissions Only	Linda Avery	15 episodes
2011	The Good Wife	Hannah Vetters	1 episode

== Coaching ==
Nathan also works as an acting and singing coach.
