= Wolf Hour =

2025 novel by Jo Nesbø

- First edition cover
- Author: Jo Nesbø
- Original title: Minnesota
- Translator: Robert Ferguson
- Language: Norwegian, English
- Genre: Crime fiction
- Publisher: Aschehoug (Norway, original publication)
- Publication date: January 8, 2025
- Media type: Print
- Pages: 156
- ISBN: 9788203450815

Wolf Hour (Norwegian: Minnesota) is a crime novel and thriller by Norwegian writer Jo Nesbø, first published by Aschehoug in January 2025. Set in Minneapolis, the novel follows Detective Bob Oz's investigation of several murders. The police initially suspect a hitman associated with the drug trade. As the perpetrator continues to evade capture, Oz realizes that the police may be tracking the wrong man. The novel address themes of gun control, racial tensions, and revenge.

== Conception ==
In an interview with The Irish News, Nesbø noted the large number of Norwegian immigrants who settled in Minnesota, including several of his relatives. He traveled to Minneapolis to research the book, where he described "maybe soul searching my roots, my people's attitudes." Nesbø told the paper that he did not write the book as a political statement about gun control, although the plot and setting gave him the opportunity to examine the issue, stating: "I want to look at the human condition from as many angles as I can – the same as with politics."

== Plot ==
Bob Oz works as a detective in the homicide division of the Minneapolis Police Department. He investigates the attempted murder of an arm's dealer. The police suspect Tomas Gomez, a man associated with several killings related to the drug trade. Oz struggles with alcohol abuse, precipitated by the death of his young daughter several years ago and the recent estrangement from his wife. Following bad behavior, the Superintendent of Police suspends Oz from duty; however, Oz continues to investigate the case. He interviews, and eventually befriends, a taxidermist, who knew Gomez after preparing a cat for him. Several murders ensue, including of a businessman, a crooked cop, and a gang leader. Oz discovers that Gomez killed the taxidermist's family accidentally in the cross fire of gang warfare. The taxidermist had murdered Gomez for revenge, along with others connected to the killing. To avoid detection, the taxidermist flayed Gomez's face and hands to create a mask and gloves, appearing as a Latino man and throwing off the cops. In a final confrontation with Oz, the taxidermist commits suicide. Years later, in 2022, a Norwegian writer travels to Minneapolis to research a book about the murders.

== Audiobook ==
The audiobook edition of Wolf Hour, narrated by Euan Morton, was published by Random House Audio on February 3, 2026. The production received the Kirkus Earphones Award in the Thriller & Suspense category.
