= Wayward Son =

Wayward Son(s) may refer to:

- Wayward Son (film), a 1999 American film
- Wayward Son (novel), a 2019 young-adult novel by Rainbow Rowell
- The Wayward Son, a 1914 silent film directed by Harry C. Mathews
- Wayward Sons (band), a British band featuring Toby Jepson
- "Wayward Sons" (Rubicon), a 2010 television episode
- Wayward Sons, a webcomic by Red Giant Entertainment
- "Carry On Wayward Son", a song by American band Kansas

== See also ==
- The Wayward Sons of Mother Earth, a 1991 album by Skyclad
