= Sam Pinkleton =

American choreographer and theatre director (born 1987)

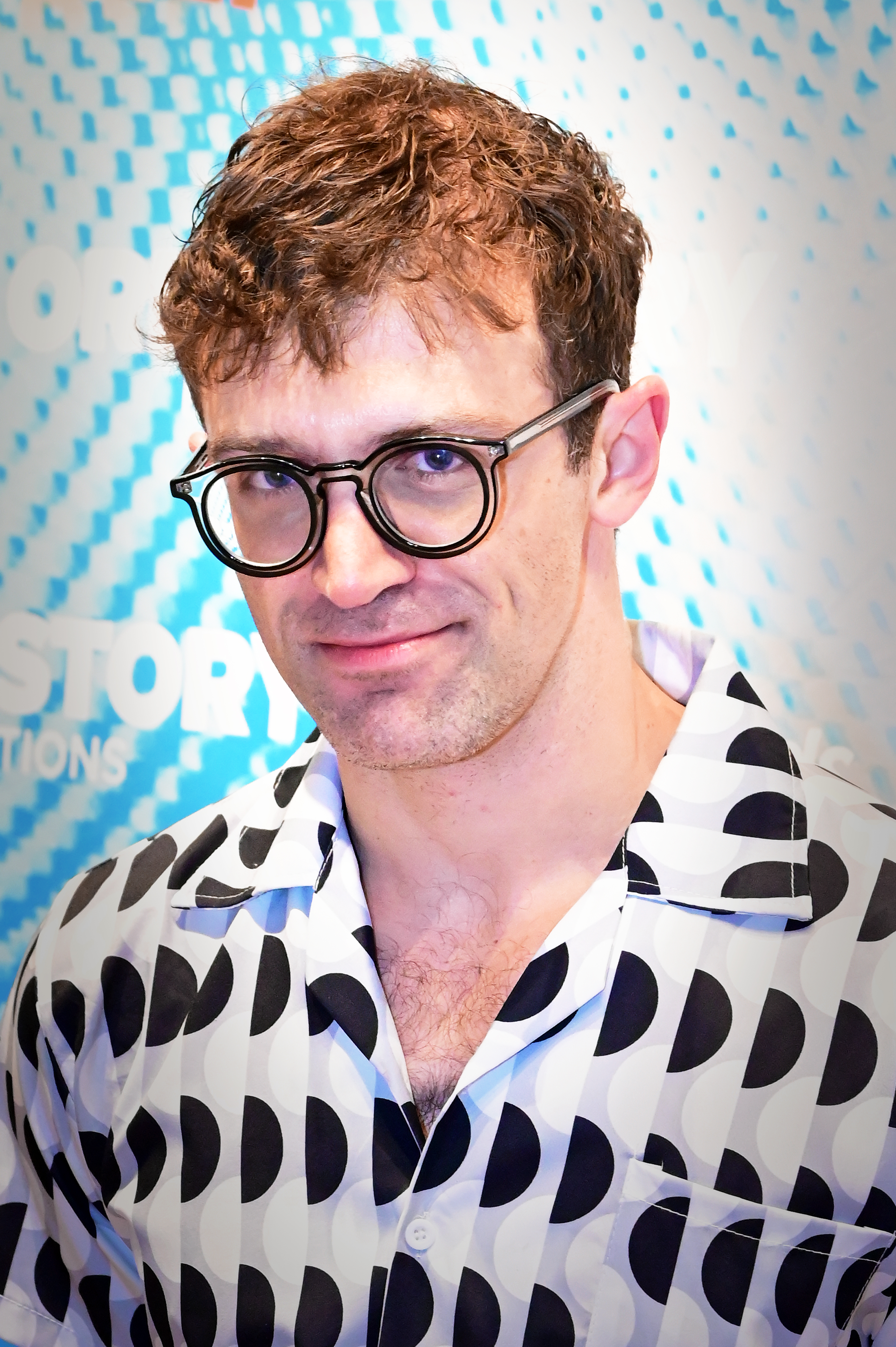
Pinkleton in 2026

Sam Pinkleton (born July 20, 1987) is a Tony-Award-winning American choreographer and theatre director.

He is known for directing the Broadway play Oh, Mary!, for which he won the Tony Award for Best Direction of a Play, and choreographing the Broadway musical Natasha, Pierre & The Great Comet of 1812, for which he received a Tony Award nomination. Pinkleton's additional work on Broadway includes choreographing the 2017 productions of Amélie and Significant Other.

== Early life and education ==
Sam Pinkleton was born on July 20, 1987, in Hopewell, a small city right outside of Richmond, Virginia.

As a child, he attended the Carter G. Woodson Middle School. Pinkleton also attended and graduated from the Appomattox Regional Governor's School for the Arts And Technology in Petersburg, Virginia, where he used to play the saxophone.

He moved to New York City when he was age eighteen to attend New York University as a musical-theatre major, but later switched to the directing program instead.

== Career ==
His first Broadway credit was in 2014 as assistant director, working on The Lyons by Nicky Silver. Pinkleton’s first choreography credit on Broadway was for a revival of Sophie Treadwell’s Machinal.

He started working on the musical Natasha, Pierre & The Great Comet of 1812 in 2013 after seeing the first performance of it in 2012 at the Ars Nova theater in New York City. The director of the show, Rachel Chavkin, asked Pinkleton to help with staging the show for a bigger space, which he agreed to do. The Great Comet then had a third run at American Repertory Theater in Cambridge, Massachusetts, before finally transferring to Broadway. During its Broadway run, the show received twelve Tony Award nominations including Best Choreography for Pinkleton.

Some of his more recent work includes co-choreographing and co-directing a production of Head over Heels at the Pasadena Playhouse in Pasadena, California, along with Jenny Koons, as well as creating a cruise-ship show for Virgin Voyages titled Untitled DanceShowPartyThing with Ani Taj and Sunny Min-Sook Hitt.

In 2019, Pinkleton worked as an artist-in-residence at New York City's Pace University.

In 2026, Pinkleton directed the Roundabout Theatre Company's Broadway production of The Rocky Horror Show.

=== Choreographic style ===
Pinkleton often talks about not having a style, but instead focusing on the current dancers he has and working with them to create something together. Pinkleton says that he never choreographs on his own body, and tries to use the previous experience and special abilities of the actors to inspire his movement.

== Theatre work ==
Year	Title	Role	Venue
2012	The Lyons	Assistant Director	Cort Theater
2014	Machinal	Choreographer	American Airlines Theatre
2015	The Heidi Chronicles	Movement Consultant	Music Box Theatre
2016	Heisenberg	Choreographer	Friedman Theatre
2016–17	Natasha, Pierre, and the Great Comet of 1812	Choreographer	Imperial Theatre
2017	Significant Other	Choreographer	Booth Theatre
2017	Amélie	Choreographer/Musical Staging	Walter Kerr Theatre
2022	Macbeth	Movement	Longacre Theatre
2022	You Will Get Sick	Director	Roundabout Theatre Company
2023	Here We Are	Choreographer	The Shed
2024	Can I Be Frank?	Director	La MaMa Experimental Theatre Club
2024	Oh, Mary!	Director	Lucille Lortel Theatre
2024	La Cage aux Folles	Director	Pasadena Playhouse
2024–25	Oh, Mary!	Director	Lyceum Theatre
2025	Here We Are	Choreographer	National Theatre
2025	Josh Sharp: ta-da!	Director	Greenwich House Theatre
2025	Can I Be Frank?	Director	SoHo Playhouse
2025	Ceilidh	Director and choreographer	M&T Bank Exchange
2026	The Rocky Horror Show	Director	Studio 54
2027	You're a Good Man, Charlie Brown	Director	New York City Center

== Awards and nominations ==
Year	Award	Category	Work	Result
2017	Tony Award	Best Choreography	Natasha, Pierre & The Great Comet of 1812	Nominated
2020	Lucille Lortel Awards	Outstanding Choreographer	Soft Power	Nominated
2025	Tony Award	Best Direction of a Play	Oh, Mary!	Won
2026	Drama League Awards	Outstanding Direction of a Musical	The Rocky Horror Show	Nominated

== See also ==
- List of choreographers
- List of people from New York City
- List of theatre directors
