= Dune (audiobook) =

2007 full-cast audiobook of Frank Herbert's novel

- Author: Frank Herbert
- Audio read by: Simon Vance, Scott Brick, Orlagh Cassidy, Euan Morton, Ilyana Kadushin and full cast
- Language: English
- Series: Dune
- Genre: Science fiction
- Publisher: Macmillan Audio
- Publication date: May 2007
- Publication place: United States
- Media type: Audiobook (18 compact discs; digital download)
- ISBN: 978-1-4272-0144-7

Dune is a 2007 unabridged audiobook adaptation of Frank Herbert's 1965 novel of the same name, produced by Macmillan Audio. It is a full-cast recording, with Simon Vance reading the connecting narration and the Scottish actor Euan Morton as the protagonist Paul Atreides, supported by a company of actors, sound effects and music.

The recording won the 2008 Audie Award for Science Fiction and received an AudioFile Earphones Award.

== Production ==
Macmillan Audio issued the recording in May 2007 as part of a series of full-cast productions of Herbert's original Dune novels. The unabridged text was released on 18 compact discs and as a digital download.

Rather than assigning the entire text to one reader, the production divides the material: Vance carries the narrative passages, while dialogue is distributed among a company of actors, with sound effects and a musical score added beneath the performances. Reviewers observed that speech attributions such as "he said" are largely dropped from the dialogue, leaving the actors to convey tone directly.

== Cast and credits ==
Macmillan Audio's credits name twelve performers, listed without the parts they play: Simon Vance, Scott Brick, Orlagh Cassidy, Euan Morton, Ilyana Kadushin, Byron Jennings, David R. Gordon, Jason Culp, Kent Broadhurst, Oliver Wyman, Patricia Kilgarriff and Scott Sowers.

Two of the twelve have been matched to their roles in a published review: Euan Morton performs Paul Atreides, and Simon Vance reads the connecting narration. The parts taken by the other ten performers are not identified in any published source.

Contemporary reviewers noted the absence of a cast list. AudioFile described it as the production's main shortcoming, and SFFaudio reported hearing performers who are not named in the published credits.

== Reception ==
AudioFile gave the production an Earphones Award, judging that the full-cast approach, with its added sound effects and score, served the novel well and made it approachable for newcomers as well as established readers. The reviewer singled out Morton's Paul for combining vulnerability with a sense of destiny, and described Vance as a dependable anchor for the narration, while criticising the absence of a full cast list.

Writing for SFFaudio, Scott D. Danielson praised the balance the production strikes between audiobook and audio drama, a register he considered most full-cast recordings fail to sustain, and rated the result among the best of its kind.

== Awards ==
Year	Award	Category	Result
2008	Audie Award	Science Fiction	Won
2008	Audie Award	Multi-Voiced Performance	Nominated
2007	AudioFile Earphones Award	—	Won

== Later productions ==
Macmillan Audio recorded the remaining novels of Herbert's original series in the same full-cast format between 2007 and 2009. Morton returned as Paul Atreides in Dune Messiah (2007) and appears in the ensemble of Chapterhouse: Dune (2009).

== See also ==
- Dune (franchise)
- Audie Award for Science Fiction
