= Hannah Solow =

American actress

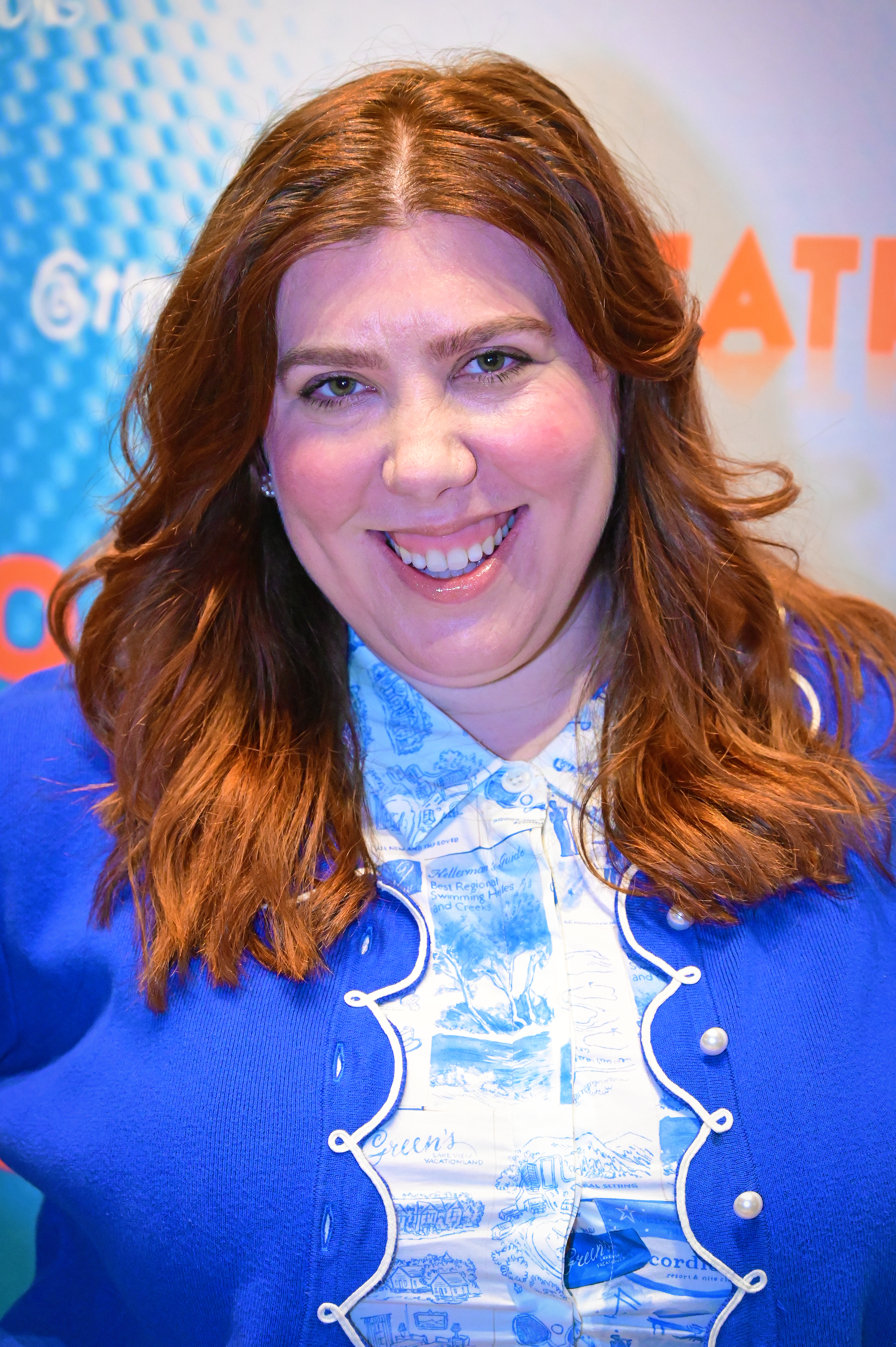
- Solow in 2026

Hannah Solow is an American actress. She is best known for her portrayal of Mary Todd Lincoln in Broadway's Oh, Mary!.

== Early life and education ==
Solow is from Orange County, California and attended Orange County School of the Arts.

Solow attended New York University's Tisch School of the Arts, graduating with a BFA in Musical Theatre. While at Tisch, she was in the CAP21 program.

== Career ==
Solow performed with Upright Citizens Brigade.

In 2024, Solow joined the cast of Oh, Mary! in its off-Broadway run at the Lucille Lortel Theatre. As the understudy for Mary and Mary's chaperone, she was the first performer to succeed Cole Escola in the principal role following their departure from the show in 2025.

== Personal life ==
Solow is Jewish.

== Acting credits ==
=== Television ===
Year	Title	Role	Notes
2013	The Morning Announcements	Student, Miranda	2 Episodes
2015	The Special Without Brett Davis	Proposal Dancer	Episode: "La Vie En Rose"
2019	UCB Comedy Originals	Actress	Episode: "Seance Party Line"
2020	The Big Fib	Self	Episode: "Soccer & Artificial Intelligence"

=== Theater ===
Year	Title	Role	Venue	Notes
2024	Oh, Mary!	Understudy, Mary Todd Lincoln and Mary's Chaperone	Lucille Lortel Theatre	Off-Broadway
2024–present	Oh, Mary!	Understudy, Mary Todd Lincoln and Mary's Chaperone	Lyceum Theatre	Broadway debut
