= ShowBusiness: The Road to Broadway =

- Directed by: Dori Berinstein
- Written by: Dori Berinstein; Richard Hankin
- Produced by: Dori Berinstein
- Starring: Alan Cumming; Boy George; Idina Menzel; Rosie O'Donnell; Kristin Chenoweth; Raul Esparza; Euan Morton; George C. Wolfe; Tonya Pinkins; Robert Lopez; Jeff Marx; Tony Kushner; Stephen Schwartz; Stephanie D'Abruzzo
- Cinematography: Alan S. Deutsch
- Edited by: Richard Hankin; Adam Zucker
- Music by: Jeanine Tesori
- Distributed by: Regent Releasing
- Release date: 2005
- Running time: 102 min
- Language: English
- Box office: $151,708

ShowBusiness: The Road to Broadway is a 2005 American documentary film, the first feature film directed by Dori Berinstein, a Broadway Producer, Writer and filmmaker. Berinstein completed the film in 2005. The film premiered at the 2005 Tribeca Film Festival. The film was named one of the top 5 films of 2006 by the IDA (International Documentary Association) and received the Grand Jury Prize for Best Documentary at the 2006 Florida Film Festival. The film was released commercially in 2007, with the first such showings on 11 May 2007 in New York City.

== Production ==
Berinstein filmed each principal musical on Broadway for her project during the 2003-2004 season, for about 600 hours of initial film footage. She focused the film on four musicals, through the difficulties of pre-production, their openings, attendant publicity around the shows, and their reviews, through the 2004 Tony Award competition. The four musicals, three of which were nominated for Best Musical at the Tony Awards that season, were:

- Wicked
- Taboo
- Caroline, or Change
- Avenue Q

The film climaxes with the 2004 Tony Awards ceremony at which Avenue Q won Best Musical over Wicked and Caroline, or Change. In addition to coverage of the musicals themselves, the movie includes interviews with New York theatre critics, and footage of several theatre critics discussing in a restaurant the various musicals and their predictions for the Tony Award winners.

== Cast ==
- Alan Cumming
- Boy George
- Idina Menzel
- Rosie O'Donnell
- Kristin Chenoweth
- Raul Esparza
- Euan Morton
- George C. Wolfe
- Tonya Pinkins
- Robert Lopez
- Jeff Marx
- Tony Kushner
- Stephen Schwartz
- Stephanie D'Abruzzo

== Reception ==
=== Critical response ===
On Rotten Tomatoes, the film holds an approval rating of 89% based on 54 reviews, with an average rating of 7.4/10. The website's critics consensus states: "Made with obvious care and attention, Showbusiness is an entertaining, insightful look into Broadway." Metacritic, which uses a weighted average, assigned the film a score of 73 out of 100, based on 14 critics, indicating "generally favorable" reviews. Theatre critic Michael Riedel received harsh criticism from actors and songwriters who were subjects of the film, after seeing his comments in the film.

=== Release ===
ShowBusiness: The Road to Broadway premiered at the 2005 Tribeca Film Festival. The film was released on DVD on October 16, 2007 by Liberation Entertainment.
