= Caligula (musical) =

- Music: Eric Svejcar
- Lyrics: Eric Svejcar
- Book: Eric Svejcar
- Basis: Roman Emperor Caligula
- Productions: 2004 New York City Concert; 2004 NY Musical Theatre Festival; 2006 Actors Studio

Caligula, subtitled "An Ancient Glam Epic", is a stage musical about the notorious Roman Emperor Caligula in the style of 1970s glam rock.

The musical's book, music, and lyrics are by Eric Svejcar. The musical was selected as a finalist for the 2003 Richard Rodgers Award. It was first presented publicly in May 2004 in a concert production at the Zipper Theatre in New York City. The first full production was presented at the 2004 New York Musical Theatre Festival (NYMF) as one of the first shows of the inaugural festival. The production received the Golden NYMF audience award and played an extended run beyond the festival at the Theatre At St. Clements in New York City. The production was directed by Michael Unger and starred Euan Morton.

Subsequent workshop productions were presented in 2006 at the Actors Studio in New York City as well as further development in conjunction with Lafayette College in Easton, PA. The latter workshop productions starred Braden Tilghman as General Cassius Chaerea and Euan Morton as Emperor Caligula. In July 2009, a staged reading was presented (starring Morton, Anastasia Barzee, David Edwards, Autumn Hurlbert, and Matt Bogart) at New World Stages in NYC.
