= Ceilidh (musical) =

2025 immersive Scottish-inspired musical

- Baltimore production (2025)
- Music: Scott Gilmour & Claire McKenzie (Noisemaker)
- Lyrics: Scott Gilmour & Claire McKenzie
- Book: Scott Gilmour & Claire McKenzie
- Premiere: September 6 to October 12, 2025: Baltimore, Maryland, United States
- Productions: Glasgow (2024 workshop); Baltimore (North American premiere); Pitlochry, Scotland (UK premiere)

Ceilidh (/ˈkeɪli/ KAY-lee; Scottish Gaelic: [ˈkʲʰeːlɪ]) is an immersive musical with music, lyrics and book by Scottish writing team Scott Gilmour and Claire McKenzie, collectively known as Noisemaker. The production is directed and choreographed by Sam Pinkleton and held its North American premiere in Baltimore, Maryland, at the M&T Bank Exchange (France–Merrick Performing Arts Center), from September 6 to October 12, 2025.

== Synopsis ==
Ceilidh tells the story of narrator Ramsey (Gilmour) and his family's legacy of being a "caller," leading cèilidh dances through the ages.

== Development ==
The musical was workshopped with nine performances in Glasgow in August 2024. An original cast album from the workshop is in development via Ghostlight Records.

Pinkleton said M&T Bank Exchange was chosen for the North American premiere because the size and style fit the show's needs. The production was also the beneficiary of a state tax credit for pre-Broadway productions.

Narrative sections are broken up by dance interludes in the format of a Scottish cèilidh. Patrons are invited, but not required, to participate.

The production commissioned a tartan for its Baltimore run. It is listed in the Scottish Register of Tartans.

== Productions ==
The show held its North American premiere at the M&T Bank Exchange in the France–Merrick Performing Arts Center in Baltimore. Producers include Grove Entertainment (Beth Williams, Mindy Rich), Barbara Whitman, Frank Marshall and Scottish-American actor Alan Cumming.

The show is set for its United Kingdom premiere at the Pitlochry Festival Theatre in Pitlochry, Scotland, from September 24 to October 17, 2026. Cumming is the theater's artistic director.

== Reception ==
Maryland Theatre Guide called the Baltimore production "altogether magical," praising the actors and musicians for helping the audience feel part of the show. WYPRTheater critic J. Wynn Rousuck called Ceilidh a "very exuberant show" and said moments in the show were deeply affecting. DC Theater Arts wrote that Ceilidh was "pure dead brilliant."

== Creative team ==
- Book and score: Scott Gilmour and Claire McKenzie
- Director and choreographer: Sam Pinkleton
- Scenic design: Rachel Hauck
- Costume design: Sarah Laux
- Lighting design: Isabella Byrd
- Sound design: Danny Erdberg and Ursula Kwong-Brown
- Music supervision: Kris Kukul

== Cast ==
Principal cast for the Baltimore run included:

- Euan Morton as Leo
- Courtney Bassett as Euna
- Paul L. Coffey as Dave / Lord Buchanan
- David Corlew as ensemble
- George Drennan as Older Leo
- Scott Gilmour as Ramsay
- Annie Grace as Older Euna
- Rori Hawthorn as Rowan
- Brandon Jackson as ensemble
- Emma McGlinchey as Yvonne
- Anne L. Nathan as Granny / Moira
- David Rowen as Lucas
- Parker Bailey Steven as ensemble
- Claire-Francis Sullivan as ensemble
- Charlie West as Fiddles
