= Attachments (novel) =

2011 novel by Rainbow Rowell

- Author: Rainbow Rowell
- Language: English
- Publisher: Dutton
- Publication date: April 14, 2011
- Publication place: United States
- Media type: Print (Hardback), Audiobook
- Pages: 323
- ISBN: 0525951989

Attachments is the first novel written by Rainbow Rowell, published in 2011. The story follows a man whose job it is to read email correspondence for the employees of the newspaper he works at, to make sure they are in compliance with policy.

The book takes place in 1999 and 2000. In long emails, coworkers and friends Beth and Jennifer trade thoughts about their romances—Beth with her marriage-phobic boyfriend, Chris, and Jennifer with her baby-mania-stricken husband, Mitch. What they don't know is that the newly hired Internet security officer, Lincoln O'Neill, is charged with monitoring emails to check for anything unnecessary or pornographic, and is reading their messages. The standard procedure would have been to send them a warning, but lonely Lincoln lets the women's inappropriate office mail slide and gets hooked on reading their dalliances, eventually developing feelings for Beth.
