= Jeff Marx =

American musical composer and lyricist

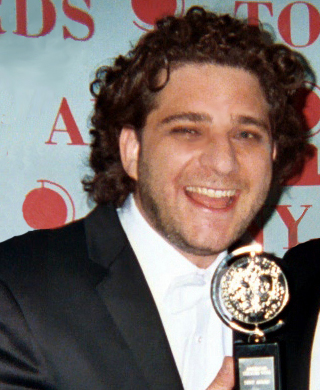
- Marx at the 58th Tony Awards

Background information
- Born: September 10, 1970 (age 56); United States
- Education: University of Michigan; Benjamin N. Cardozo School of Law (JD)
- Genres: Musical
- Occupations: Composer
- Spouse: Andrew Hawkins

Jeff Marx (born September 10, 1970) is an American composer and lyricist of musicals. He is best known for creating the Broadway musical Avenue Q with collaborator Robert Lopez.

== Early life ==
Marx grew up in a Jewish family in Hollywood, Florida. He attended Pine Crest School in Fort Lauderdale, Florida. Following graduation, he attended the University of Michigan, where he was a member of the Men's Glee Club. He also holds a Juris Doctor degree from the Benjamin N. Cardozo School of Law and is a member of the New York State Bar Association, but he does not practice law.

== Musical career ==
After passing the New York State Bar examination Marx enrolled at the BMI Lehman Engel Musical Theater Workshop in order to meet potential clients in the entertainment industry. Here, he met Robert Lopez who was also in the course.

Their first major project together, a spec Muppet movie, Kermit, Prince of Denmark, which was very loosely based on Hamlet, won them (as part of a tie) part of the $150,000 Kleban Award.

Together, they created the original concept for Avenue Q and wrote all the show's 21 songs. Avenue Q ran over six years on Broadway and then moved Off-Broadway where it ran another nine years before closing on April 28, 2019. It continues to have various international productions.

Avenue Q won the 2004 Tony Award for Best Musical. Lopez/Marx's musical score earned them a 2004 Tony Award, and another Tony Award was awarded to Avenue Q bookwriter Jeff Whitty. The musical's Original Cast Album, on the RCA/Victor label, was nominated for a Grammy Award.

Marx (and his parents) can be seen in the documentary film ShowBusiness: The Road to Broadway, which followed the trajectories of four Tony-nominated musicals from 2004, Avenue Q, Wicked, Taboo and Caroline, or Change. Marx, along with filmmaker Dori Berinstein and actor Alan Cumming, provided the audio commentary for the documentary's DVD.

Lopez and Marx wrote (with Debra Fordham) four songs for a musical episode of the NBC sitcom Scrubs which aired on January 18, 2007. Their song "Everything Comes Down to Poo" was nominated for an Emmy Award. Marx appeared in the episode as a pharmacist, dancing in the background during the song "We're Gonna Miss You Carla". The New York Times reported that the episode "energized a cast and crew that, at a point when most situation comedies are sputtering along or dead, have recently been doing some of their best work." In comparing it to his work on Avenue Q, Marx said: "It took us five years to write Avenue Q ... There were a million readings and previews and staged readings. With this thing, we wrote the songs in a week. They rehearsed for a week. They filmed it in a week, and it was done. It was liberating, and a collaborative effort that created a much more feel-good way of working."

Marx co-wrote the theme song for the Logo Network's animated series Rick & Steve: The Happiest Gay Couple in All the World and contributed additional songs for the show.

Lopez and Marx have written songs for the Disney Channel TV series Bear in the Big Blue House and The Book of Pooh, as well as touring stage musicals for the children's theater company Theaterworks/USA.

On December 13, 2008, Marx premiered a new song he wrote, "White Kwanzaa", on the CNN show D.L. Hughley Breaks the News.

Marx was an original collaborator with Lopez and South Park creators Trey Parker and Matt Stone on the 2011 Broadway musical The Book of Mormon. However, Marx departed the show before its premiere. "I worked with them on it and then we split up and made a deal," Marx told Broadway Journal in 2016. "I don't want to say more than that except that I'm extremely happy the show has been so successful!"

Marx collaborated with Mervyn Warren on a song called "You Have More Friends Than You Know" for the It Gets Better organization. The song was featured on the television program Glee on April 18, 2013. Marx recorded his version of the song and made it available for download with a portion of the proceeds going to support The Trevor Project. Marx has also made a karaoke version of the song available for those who want to perform their own version and help spread the song's message, and has featured other versions on the song's website.

In 2015, a stage musical titled Home Street Home premiered in San Francisco. It was co-written by Marx with Fat Mike of punk band NOFX, and activist and dominatrix Soma Snakeoil.

== Other work ==
Marx has also written the book How To Win A High School Election.
