= Rainbow Rowell =

American writer

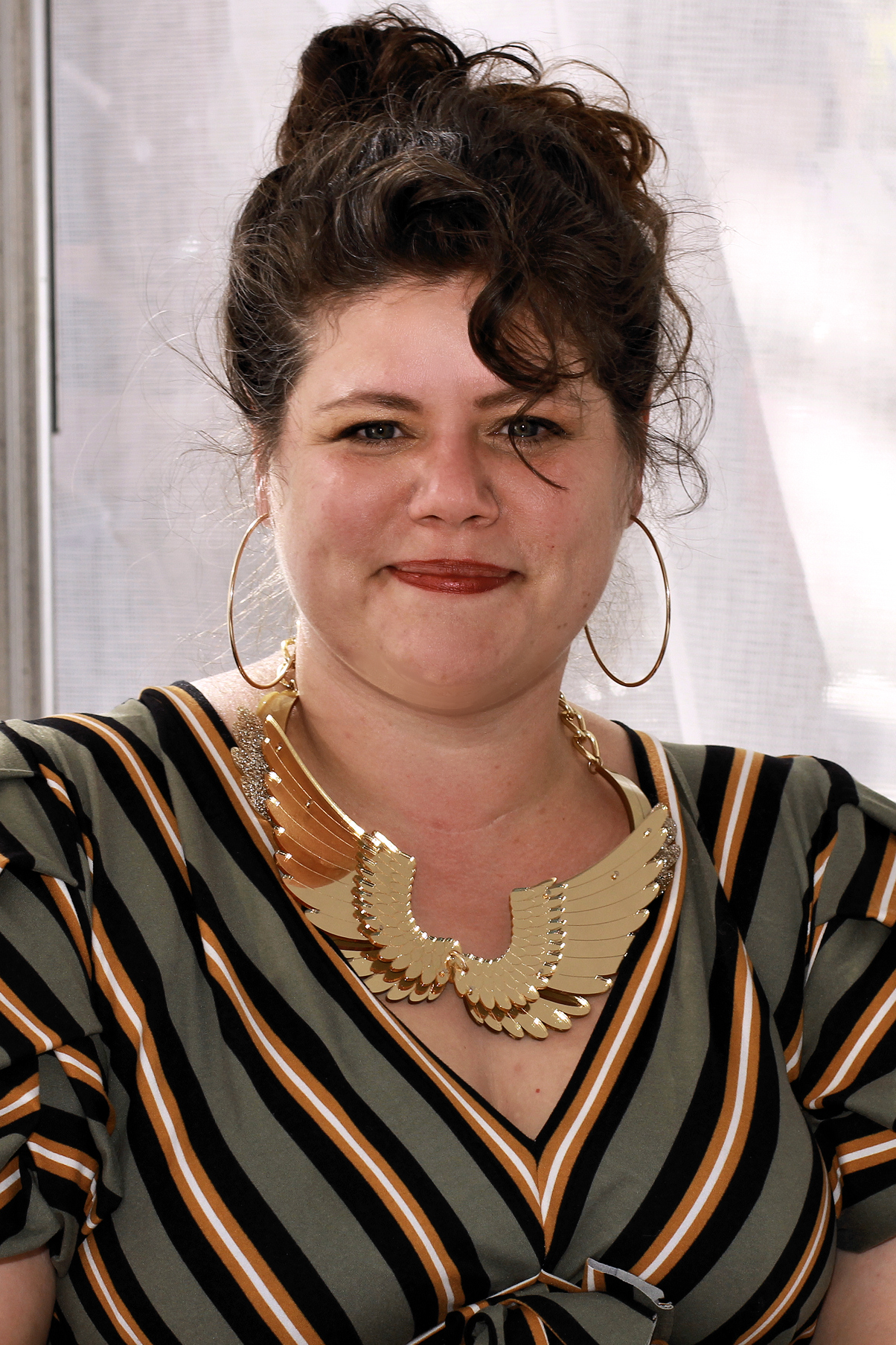
- Rowell at the 2019 Texas Book Festival.
- Born: February 24, 1973 (age 53); Nebraska, United States
- Occupation: Writer
- Writing career
- Period: 2011–present
- Genres: Young adult, New adult fiction, Contemporary fiction
- Notable works: Fangirl, Carry On, Eleanor & Park, Runaways
- Website: rainbowrowell.com

Rainbow Rowell (born February 24, 1973) is an American author known for young adult and adult contemporary novels. Her young adult novels Eleanor & Park (2012), Fangirl (2013), and Carry On (2015) have been subjects of critical acclaim.

She was the writer of the 2017 revival of Marvel Comics' Runaways and for She-Hulk from 2022 to 2024.

== Early and personal life ==
Rainbow Rowell was born on February 24, 1973, in Nebraska. She spent much of her childhood living in rural areas, and often times lived in poverty without consistent access to electricity or running water. Rowell has said that her father's presence during her childhood was occasional and that he struggled with alcohol and drug abuse. She has also said that her mother provided the family stability and encouraged her to have a love of reading. She has a sister named Jade and a half sister, Abby, who owns a popular local coffee chain in Omaha, NE.

Rowell has said that during high school she was involved in the school newspaper and that she continued writing through college journalism work before moving into professional journalism and advertising. Rowell was a columnist and ad copywriter at the Omaha World-Herald from 1995 to 2012.

In a 2021 interview, Rowell stated that she wrote Carry On (2015) while ill and later learned she had an undiagnosed parathyroid disorder. She explained that the gap between when Carry On (2015) and Wayward Son (2019) was released was due to her focusing on her recovery and other projects at the time. Rowell also said Any Way the Wind Blows (2021) was shaped by her experiences writing during the COVID-19 pandemic.

Currently Rowell lives in Omaha, Nebraska.

== Career ==
=== Adult novels ===
After leaving her position as a columnist, Rowell began working for an ad agency and writing what would become her first published novel, Attachments, as a pastime. Rowell gave birth to her first son during this period and paused work on the manuscript for two years. The novel, a contemporary romantic comedy about a company's IT guy who falls in love with a woman whose email he has been monitoring, was published in 2011. Kirkus Reviews listed it as one of the outstanding debuts that year.

In 2014, Rowell published Landline, a contemporary adult novel about a marriage in trouble.

In August 2023, Rowell sold the future publishing rights of four adult novels to William Morrow and Company. The first, titled Slow Dance, was released in July 2024. Rowell's next novel, Cherry Baby, was released in April 2026.

In November 2026, Rowell announced she was the author of Corinne, a novel previously published under the pseudonym Rebecca Morrow in 2022. A new and edited edition will be released in July 2027 under Rowell's name, with a newly announced sequel, Catch Us the Foxes, set to be released in Spring 2028.

=== Young adult novels ===
==== Eleanor & Park ====
In 2012, Rowell published the young adult novel, Eleanor & Park. In 2014, DreamWorks optioned Eleanor & Park, and Rowell worked on a screenplay, but in 2016, Rowell said the option timed out and the rights reverted to her. In 2019, it was announced that Picturestart had acquired the film rights, with Rowell writing the screenplay and executive producing.

Rowell's work garnered some negative attention in 2013 when a parents' group at a Minnesota high school challenged Eleanor & Park and Rowell was disinvited to a library event; a panel ultimately determined that the book could stay on library shelves. Rowell noted in an interview that the material that these parents were calling "profane" was what many kids in difficult situations realistically had to deal with, and that "when these people call Eleanor & Park an obscene story, I feel like they’re saying that rising above your situation isn’t possible."

==== Fangirl ====
In 2013, Rowell published the young adult novel Fangirl about Cath, a college freshman who writes fan fiction of a fictional book series about Simon Snow, a young mage at a magical school. It was influenced by the popularity of fan fiction of the Harry Potter series by J.K. Rowling.

In 2020, it was announced that Fangirl would receive a four-part manga adaptation, adapted by Sam Maggs and illustrated by Gabi Nam.

==== Simon Snow trilogy ====
Rowell created a trilogy of novels based on the characters from Cath's fan fiction in Fangirl. Her 2015 novel Carry On shares a title with the popular fan fiction story Cath wrote in Fangirl. In the novel, Simon Snow, in his eighth year at school, comes to terms with his calling as the Chosen One meant to destroy the Insidious Humdrum, a magical force destroying the world of mages. He embarks on his quest with his best friend Penelope and his girlfriend Agatha, all the while "struggling" with Tyrannus Basilton "Baz" Grimm-Pitch, his vampire "nemesis." Rowell's Simon Snow trilogy was completed with the 2019 novel Wayward Son and 2021's Any Way the Wind Blows.

=== Comics and graphic novels ===
In January 2014, Rowell signed a two-book deal with First Second Books to author two young adult graphic novels, the first of which was illustrated by Faith Erin Hicks and released on August 27, 2019.

Rowell has also written for Marvel Comics. Between 2017 and 2021, Rowell wrote Runaways, and from 2022 to 2024 wrote She-Hulk. In 2025, Rowell returned to Marvel for a five issue limited series of Runaways.

== Bibliography ==
=== Young adult ===
- Eleanor & Park (2012)
- Fangirl (2013)

==== Simon Snow series ====
- Carry On (2015)
- Wayward Son (2019)
- Any Way the Wind Blows (2021)
- My Rosebud Boy (2022), Simon Snow bonus story

=== Adult ===
- Attachments (2011)
- Landline (2014)
- Corinne (as Rebecca Morrow) (2022)
- Slow Dance (2024)
- Cherry Baby (2026)
- Catch us the Foxes (upcoming, 2028)

=== Short fiction collections ===
- Almost Midnight (2017): Compilation of two short stories: "Midnights" and "Kindred Spirits.
- Scattered Showers (2022)

=== Short fiction ===
- "Midnights", My True Love Gave to Me: Twelve Holiday Stories, ed. Stephanie Perkins (2014)
- Kindred Spirits (World Book Day Edition) (2016)
- The Prince and the Troll (2020)
- If the Fates Allow (2021)
- In Waiting (2023)

=== Comics series ===
==== Runaways ====
- Runaways, Vol. 1: Find Your Way Home (2018), and Kris Anka, with Matthew Wilson

Collecting issues 1-6

- Runaways, Vol. 2: Best Friends Forever (2018), and Kris Anka, with Matthew Wilson

Collecting issues 7-12

- Runaways, Vol. 3: That Was Yesterday (2019), and Kris Anka, with Matthew Wilson

Collecting issues 13-18

- Runaways, Vol. 4: But You Can’t Hide (2019), and Andres Genolet

Collecting issues 19-24

- Runaways, Vol. 5: Canon Fodder (2020), and Andres Genolet

Collecting issues 25-31

- Runaways, Vol. 6: Come Away with Me (2021), and Andres Genolet

Collecting issues 32-38

- Think of the Children (2026), an upcoming Runaways volume

==== She-Hulk ====
- She-Hulk, Vol. 1: Jen, Again (2022), illustrated by Roge Antonio and Luca Maresca

Collecting issues 1-5

- She-Hulk, Vol. 2: Jen of Hearts (2023), illustrated by Luca Maresca and Takeshi Miyazawa

Collecting issues 6-10

- She-Hulk, Vol. 3: Girl Can’t Help It (2023), illustrated by Andres Genolet

Collecting issues 11-15

- She-Hulk, Vol. 4: Jen-Sational (2024), illustrated by Andres Genolet and Ig Guara
- She-Hulk, Vol. 5: All In (2024), illustrated by Andres Genolet and Ig Guara

=== Standalone graphic novels and comics ===
- Pumpkinheads, illustrated by Faith Erin Hicks (2019)
- "The Kid's Got a Good Eye", illustrated by Olivier Coipel, in Amazing Fantasy 1000 (2022)
- "Red Letter Days", illustrated by Cian Tormey, in Superman Red and Blue 2025 Special (2025)
- Spider-Man: Holiday Spectacular #1, illustrated by Paco Medina, Robert Quinn, Nathan Stockman, Luciano Vecchio, (2025)

=== Manga and graphic adaptations ===
- Fangirl, Vol. 1: The Manga (2020), adapted by Sam Maggs and illustrated by Gabi Nam
- Fangirl, Vol. 2: The Manga (2022), adapted by Sam Maggs and illustrated by Gabi Nam
- Fangirl, Vol. 3: The Manga (2023), adapted by Rainbow Rowell and illustrated by Gabi Nam
- Fangirl, Vol. 4: The Manga (2024), adapted by Rainbow Rowell and illustrated by Gabi Nam

== Literary themes and reception ==
Rowell’s work often focuses on characters who feel marginalized or out of place. With her young adult novels exploring on the intensity of first love, identity formation, and the search for belonging. She has also said that she is drawn to fantasy as a genre because it allows familiar stories to be examined from new perspectives, and has defended the ongoing appeal of “Chosen One” narratives when used thoughtfully.

Rowell’s work has also attracted scholarly attention, particularly Eleanor & Park, which has been analyzed in academic literature for its perspective of adolescence, social conflict, racism, and gender roles. Academic studies have examined the novel’s subversion of traditional romance stereotypes and the depiction of how young characters actively shape their own lives and navigate complex emotional and social environments.

Several of Rowell’s books, most notably Eleanor & Park, have been subject to content challenges and attempted censorship, particularly in schools. Objections have typically focused on the novel’s use of profanity, depictions of sexuality, and portrayal of domestic abuse and poverty. In some instances, parents or community members have argued that the book was inappropriate for teenage readers.

Rowell has defended the use of difficult subject matter in her work, stating that her novels reflect the realities many young readers already face. In interviews, she has argued that exposure to stories addressing violence, class divides and struggle, and emotional hardship can create more empathy and resilience in young readers, and that removing those books would limit opportunities for greater understanding and discussion.

== Awards and recognition ==
Rowell’s work has received numerous awards and recognitions. Eleanor & Park was named a Michael L. Printz Honor Book, recognizing excellence in young adult literature. Her novels and graphic works have also appeared on YALSA lists, including Teens’ Top Ten and Quick Picks for Reluctant Young Adult Readers. Additionally, Carry On was included on the Rainbow Book List, which highlights books with significant LGBTQIA+ content for young readers. Eleanor and Park and Rowell's other novel Fangirl were both named by The New York Times as among the best young adult fiction of the year. Eleanor & Park was also chosen by Amazon as one of the 10 best books of 2013.
