= Fangirl (novel) =

2013 book by Rainbow Rowell

- First edition
- Author: Rainbow Rowell
- Cover artist: ND Stevenson
- Language: English
- Genre: Contemporary Young Adult
- Publisher: St. Martin's Press
- Publication date: September 10, 2013
- Publication place: United States
- Media type: Print
- Pages: 445 (Hardcover)
- ISBN: 9780804121286

Fangirl is a young adult novel by Rainbow Rowell, published in 2013. Fangirl is Rowell's second published young adult book, following Eleanor & Park, and third published book overall.

== Synopsis ==
Twin sisters Cath and Wren begin their freshman year at the University of Nebraska–Lincoln. While the more outgoing Wren is making new friends and partying, Cath struggles to adjust due to her social anxiety. Most of Cath's free time is spent writing fan fiction (mostly slash fiction) about the fictional Simon Snow series; though the sisters once enjoyed fan fiction together, Wren professes to have outgrown it and distances herself from Cath.

Cath becomes more interested in her writing classes and befriends her classmate Nick, whom she regularly meets for writing sessions. Despite this, she remains depressed; her roommate Reagan and Reagan's friend Levi decide to try and help her. As Cath becomes closer to Levi, he eventually reveals he is romantically interested in her. Just before finals, Cath's father has a bipolar episode, and is involuntarily committed to a psychiatric hospital. Cath ditches her exams and her final paper to take care of her father.

Cath nearly gives up on her studies, Wren, and her friends, but ultimately decides to continue and learn how to cope with her problems. Cath and her sister reunite in the hospital after Wren gets alcohol poisoning. Cath encounters her mother there, who had abandoned them years before. As the school year ends, Cath finishes her novel, and struggles to write an original short story for her class.

== Characters ==
Rowell stated that most of the characters have names taken from buildings on the University of Nebraska–Lincoln's campus.

Cather "Cath" Avery

The protagonist of the novel, and title's namesake "Fangirl," Cath is an identical twin and shyer than her sister. Cath is a talented writer, and her hobby is writing fan fiction. In her family, Cath is close to her father and sister.

Wren Avery

Wren is the more confident and less responsible twin. Wren cares about fitting in and partying more than her studies or looking after herself. Wren is described by Cath as having had many boyfriends. After experiencing alcohol poisoning, she agrees to change her ways.

Levi Stewart

Cath's friend and, ultimately, boyfriend. Levi is tall, blonde and comes from a farming background, hoping to eventually work on his family's ranch. Cath describes him as having a smile for everyone, being polite, smart and an extrovert. Before the events of the book, he and Reagan dated, but split up once he discovered her cheating. Levi is shown to be faithful and loyal, and tries to get Cath to come out of her shell.

Reagan

Cath's roommate. Reagan is sarcastic, cynical and often mean to Cath, although this is apparently the way she shows affection. She eventually befriends Cath.

Arthur Avery

Cath and Wren's father. Arthur is bipolar. He is described as a marketing genius. In the middle of the novel, he suffers from a bipolar episode and is committed to a mental institution. He is an accepting parent and lets his daughters make their own decisions.

Laura Avery

Cath and Wren's mother. She left the girls when they were 8, promising to keep in touch, but did not. She attempts contact with the twins throughout the novel, but is only given a chance by Wren, as Cath resents her.

Nick Manter

Cath's classmate and partner in a creative writing assignment. Cath describes him as looking like "someone with a steerage ticket on the Titanic".

Professor Piper

Cath's writing professor. She is described as a small woman with long brown hair streaked with grey, and high cheekbones. She believes in Cath's writing talent and lets her take the semester to work on her final assignment. Professor Piper disapproves of fan fiction and criticizes it as unoriginal.

== Reception ==
The critical reception to the book was positive, noting, in particular, its realistic portrayal of fan culture. A reviewer for Tor.com calls it "true-to-geek-life" and notes that "Rowell understands something vital in her novel, and that is that fandom is so much more than escapism—it is, whether conscious or unconsciously—a way for folks to interact with their surroundings." Entertainment Weekly gives Rowell credit for capturing both the universe of fan fiction and the inside of a young person's head. A Kirkus starred review calls the novel "absolutely captivating." When Fangirl was chosen as the inaugural book for the Tumblr book club, a Tumblr representative noted its themes of loving books and creating art, its appeal to readers of all ages, and Rowell's existing fan base on the social media platform as reasons for the choice.

== Spin-off novels ==
In October 2015, Rowell published the novel Carry On as a standalone fantasy story of the same name of Cath's fan fiction in Fangirl. The story follows Simon Snow and his rival, Baz Pitch, over the course of their final year of magical schooling.

In October 2019, Rowell published the sequel of the novel, Wayward Son. The novel tells the story of the aftermath of what happened in Carry On.

The final book in the Simon Snow trilogy, Any Way the Wind Blows was published in July 2021.

== Manga ==
From 2020 to 2024, Sam Maggs adapted Fangirl into an authorized four-volume original English-language manga illustrated by Gabi Nam and published by Viz Media.
