= Eleanor & Park =

2012 novel written by Rainbow Rowell

- First edition (UK)
- Author: Rainbow Rowell
- Language: English
- Genre: Romance
- Publisher: Orion Books
- Publication date: April 2012
- Publication place: United States
- Media type: Print (Hardback), Audiobook
- Pages: 333
- ISBN: 1250012570

Eleanor & Park is the first young adult novel written by Rainbow Rowell. Published in 2012, the story follows dual narratives by Eleanor and Park, two misfits living in Omaha, Nebraska from 1986 to 1987. Eleanor, a chubby 16-year-old girl with curly red hair, and Park, a 16-year-old biracial Korean boy, meet on a school bus on Eleanor's first day at the school and gradually connect through comic books and mixtapes of 1980s music, sparking a love story.

== Plot ==
Eleanor Douglas is beginning tenth grade. She is the oldest in a family with one younger sister and four younger brothers who live with their mother and stepfather, Richie, in a tiny two-bedroom house. The children share one bedroom. There is one bathroom, and Richie has removed the door and will only allow a curtain for privacy. Richie is physically and emotionally abusive to their mother and often drunk. The children live in terror of him. Eleanor does not own properly fitting clothes. She patches her clothes in bright colors, wears ribbons in her hair, and creates strange clothing combinations and accessories, over which her fellow students bully her. Eleanor has just returned home after sleeping on the couch of her mother’s high school friend since Richie threw her out a year earlier.

Park Sheridan has lived in Omaha his whole life. While his family is not affluent, and his parents come from very different backgrounds, his home is filled with love. While his father is tall and masculine, Park takes after his mother in appearance and is shorter than his younger brother. Park believes he is a disappointment and is unenthusiastic about taekwondo, which his father values. Park is instead interested in alternative music and comics. He feels insecure about his size and Asian heritage, despite getting along with the popular kids at school.

On Eleanor's first day at her new school, the students find her weird. They rearrange their seats on the school bus to get her yelled at by the driver. When Eleanor is about to cry, Park rudely offers her a seat. They have a few classes together during which Park notices Eleanor is one of the smartest students in class. They begin to connect.

Eleanor is regularly bullied at school. Girls cover her gym locker with sanitary pads, and someone writes disgusting and inappropriate remarks on her school books. At home, Richie frequently screams at Eleanor's mother and abuses her while drunk. One night, Eleanor hears gunshots and calls the police, but they believe Richie's lies over her report. Eleanor tries to conceal her living situation from Park, but gets frustrated when he takes some things for granted, like a telephone, batteries, or safety. She tries to reject Park's gifts, believing herself unworthy. The two spend more time together in secret, since Richie won't allow Eleanor to have a boyfriend, and her mother and siblings' loyalties have shifted to Richie. Park professes his love for Eleanor, making her uncomfortable. Her first meeting with his parents, especially his mother, does not go well.

Park gets into a fight with Steve, who was bullying Eleanor, and lands a taekwondo kick to Steve's mouth. Park's nose is broken in return. His mother grounds him "forever", thinking Eleanor is leading Park into trouble and is a "weird white girl". Park's father, on the other hand, is proud of Park and understands that Richie is an abusive alcoholic. After seeing Eleanor's family, Park's mother invites Eleanor to stay at their house. Eleanor accepts and lies to her family about it. Eleanor's uncle offers to take Eleanor to Minnesota for the summer so she can attend a program for gifted teens, but Richie says no.

One night, Park's mom tells the kids to go on a date. Eleanor returns home to a fight between Richie and her mother and she finds her personal possessions destroyed. She matches a hateful message written by Richie to the handwriting of the highly perverted notes in her school books. Eleanor flees and ends up in Steve's garage with him, Tina, Mikey, and another girl who turn out to not be as bad as she had thought. She goes to Park's house and tries to formulate a way to get to her uncle in St. Paul, Minnesota. Park insists upon driving her. His father sees him sneaking out of the house, but, surprisingly, gives Park money and tells him to take the truck. Park leaves Eleanor at her uncle's house. Eleanor's aunt and uncle welcome her and plan to remove her siblings as well.

Park sends Eleanor letters, but she does not respond. In fact, she doesn't even read them. Park tries to forget her, but can't. Soon, Eleanor's siblings and mother disappear from Richie's house, leaving Richie alone once again. Park passes by Eleanor's former house frequently, longing for her. Park encounters Richie one day as he is coming back from one of his drinking binges. Park fantasizes about killing Richie frequently, because he "can" and "should", but ends up only kicking the ground in front of Richie's face, who had fallen in the snow. Six months later, Park receives a postcard from Eleanor with three words on it.

== Themes ==
=== Escape ===
Eleanor desperately seeks for a way to get out of her everyday house and Richie, even though she knows that would mean leaving Park behind. She gets what she wants when Park offers to drive her to Minnesota, away from Richie and her house but what he gets in return is that Eleanor's mother and siblings also go to where she is, leaving Park with just memories the two have made together.

=== Domestic abuse ===
A key issue revolves around Eleanor and her stepfather, Richie. There are countless times when Eleanor notices bruises on her mother's face. Richie abuses Eleanor's mother both physically – though Rowell never shows Richie hitting Eleanor's mother, Sabrina – and emotionally. Richie yells at and controls Sabrina throughout most of the novel, and Eleanor is so used to it that she can "sleep through the screaming." Sabrina treads lightly around Richie, so as not to spike his anger, making sure everything is right so Richie will not hurt her or the kids. Later in the novel, crass notes written by Richie directed towards Eleanor are shown.

=== Child abuse ===
Richie physically abuses the kids, hitting them when they do something wrong, as well as verbally abusing them, calling them insults. The kids go without new clothes or shoes, wearing the few items Eleanor's mother can get at Goodwill. The children do not have toothbrushes or toothpaste, nor shampoo or conditioner to wash their hair; they only have access to dishwashing soap. They do not have much to eat, either. All five children sleep in a small bedroom with a bunk bed, the boys on the floor, Eleanor on the top bunk and Eleanor's younger sister on the bottom.

=== Bullying ===
Eleanor deals with bullying at school and at home. At school, her classmate Tina and other students bully her about her size, her hair, and her clothes. Eleanor's father makes comments about her size, as well as Richie, whose comments are much more vulgar.

=== Body image ===
Eleanor is constantly bullied about her size. She wears large clothing because her cast-off Goodwill clothing is seldom in her size. In one brief moment with her father, Eleanor says he used to drop "hints about her weight." Richie hurls insults at Eleanor about her appearance. Eleanor does not hate being fat, but dislikes how much of an outcast she becomes because she looks different than anyone else. Park loves everything about Eleanor, body type included.

== Reception and honors ==
The critical reception for the book has been mostly positive. Kirkus Reviews said: "Funny, hopeful, foulmouthed, sexy and tear-jerking, this winning romance will captivate teen and adult readers alike." Author John Green said Eleanor & Park "reminded me not just what it's like to be young and in love with a girl, but also what it's like to be young and in love with a book."

The American Library Association gave the book a 2014 Michael L. Printz Award Honor book for excellence in young adult literature. Calling Eleanor & Park "an honest, heart-wrenching portrayal of imperfect but unforgettable love," The Boston Globe and The Horn Book Magazine presented Rowell the 2013 Boston Globe-Horn Book Award for fiction. The New York Times Book Review named it one of seven Notable Children's Books of 2013. NPR said Eleanor & Park "captures the pure, visceral thrill of a high school swoon, but it never forgets that those feelings are real and important" in naming the book to its list of the Best Books of 2013. The Association for Library Service to Children, the Young Adult Library Services Association and Booklist recognized the audiobook version of Eleanor & Park with a 2014 Odyssey Honor.

Additional honors for Eleanor & Park:

- Indies Choice Young Adult Book of the Year by the American Booksellers Association
- Amazon's Teen Book of the Year and Top Ten Book of the Year
- Goodreads Choice Award for Best Young Adult Book of the Year
- Young Adult Library Services Association Top Ten Best Fiction for Young Adults
- Audible's Best Teen Audiobook of the Year

== Controversy ==
=== Anoka-Hennepin School District incident ===
The Anoka-Hennepin School District, the largest school district in Minnesota, revised its policies following a challenge of the book at Anoka High School. The parents of an Anoka High student, partnering with a citizen's group within the district, had challenged the book's place in school libraries, calling it "vile profanity" because of its crude language. They cited 227 instances of coarse language and sexuality and demanded it be pulled from library shelves. The district and the Anoka County Library withdrew an invitation to the author to speak about the book. When the Anoka High principal convened a committee of parents, staff and a student to review the book, the committee determined that it was powerful, realistic and appropriate for high schoolers. During this controversy, the book received support from the National Coalition Against Censorship, which noted irony in the school district canceling an appearance by the author that was scheduled to occur during Banned Books Week.

=== Criticism of racism ===
The book has received some criticism for being anti-Asian. Critics say Rowell mishandles Park, a biracial Korean-American boy, and that his internalized racism is never unpacked by the end of the story. Critics also accuse Rowell of fetishizing and exoticizing Park throughout the book. At one point, Eleanor says that Park "looked dangerous. Like Ming the Merciless," referencing a stereotypical Asian villain from the Flash Gordon comic strip and TV show. Critics also noted that the author often fixated and exoticized Park's physical features, describing his eyes as green but "almond shaped", "almond flavored" and "almondy", as well as describing his skin as "honey". The former is a common but inaccurate description of epicanthic folds, and the implication of the latter is that it is an alternative way of calling Park "yellow", a labeling that has racist roots directed toward people of Asian descent. Park's younger brother, Josh, is described as white-passing, and Park's Asian features are described to have negatively affected his appearance unlike his brother's features. Taekwondo is misspelled as "taekwando" and is also treated as interchangeable with kung fu at one point (the former is Korean while the latter is Chinese).

Rowell has also received criticism for Park's name, as Park is a common Korean surname rather than a given name. Rowell has addressed the character's name on her website's frequently asked questions page:

My backstory for Park's name was that "Park" is his mom's family name, and that his parents thought it would be nice for him to have both their names, "Park" and "Sheridan." This is fairly common in American families – to use the mom's maiden name as the kid's first or middle name. (It's a tradition in my family.) I was also thinking about how in lots of families, the oldest kid has a more unusual name. (Like "Rainbow.") And then the parents decide to play it safer with younger kids. (My brother is literally named "Jerry.")

Some have responded that this custom, which applies to Rowell's white American family, is unlikely to apply to Park's South Korean immigrant mother. There are also accusations of the book romanticizing the relationship between Korean women and American soldiers during war times and having racist depictions of an Asian woman – Park's mother is described as a "China doll". In addition, in a now-deleted post, the author addressed her reasons on making Park Korean (Note: the post, however, still remains on the author's personal Goodreads account). Reasons range from her father serving in Korea in the Army and being in love with a Korean girl to old Asian-American high school classmates, and representation in young adult books during the time the book was released.

There aren't a lot of Asian boys in YA; the character calls attention to himself. Why would a white author write about an Asian guy? I don't have a complete, definitive answer. Why is Park Korean? Because I think there should be more Asian-American characters in YA, especially boys. (And also more chubby girls.) Because it's up to people like me, who write, to write them ... Because that's how I saw him the moment I saw him. And then I couldn't imagine him any other way.

Some people have expressed concern about the film adaptation having a Japanese director due to historical conflict between Japan and Korea.

The book has also been criticized for perpetuating anti-black stereotypes. In the novel, Eleanor makes friends with two black girls named Beebi and DeNice. The two characters have been viewed as stereotypical.

== Film ==
In 2014, it was announced that DreamWorks had purchased the rights to make an Eleanor & Park film adaptation, for which Rowell was asked to write the screenplay. In May 2016, however, Rowell confirmed via Twitter that the film was no longer in development, and the rights were back with her. Then again in May 2019, Rowell confirmed via Instagram that a movie was again in the works under and that she would be writing the screenplay. The film was officially announced to be produced by Picturestart and Brad Pitt's production company Plan B.

In July 2020, author Rainbow Rowell announced on her Twitter that the film adaptation of Eleanor & Park will be directed by Japanese filmmaker Hikari and that casting would also commence the same month.

As of November 2025, no movie has been released.
