= Land Line Magazine =

American trucking trade magazine

- Managing Editor: Jami Jones
- Frequency: 9 per year
- Total circulation: 214,000 (June 2016)
- Founded: 1975
- Company: Owner–Operator Independent Drivers Association
- Country: USA
- Based in: Grain Valley, Missouri
- Language: English
- Website: www.landline.media
- ISSN: 0279-6503

Land Line Magazine is an American nationally distributed business publication written for professional truckers operating trucks and semi-trailers in for-hire transportation of exempt and regulated commodities. It is the official publication of the Owner-Operator Independent Drivers Association.

== History and profile ==
Land Line Magazine was established in 1975. The magazine is one-third of the media arm of OOIDA, along with Land Line Now, a one-hour news and information program on SiriusXM Satellite Radio, and LandLine.Media, which features trucking news and information updated daily.

The news section of Land Line covers a variety of topics, with particular emphasis placed on federal and state legislation and regulations that affect the trucking industry. However, the magazine also features product announcements and reviews, personality features, advice on operating a business, technical information and “how-tos.”

The magazine and its staff have won numerous awards from the International Automotive Media Awards, Truck Writers of North America and the Society of Professional Journalists/Kansas City Press Club.
