= The Chosen One (trope) =

Narrative trope

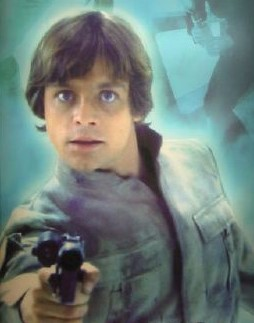
Luke Skywalker from Star Wars is an example of an archetypal Chosen One

The Chosen One, also known as The One or The Chosen, is a narrative trope in which one character, usually the protagonist, is framed as the inevitable hero of the story as a result of destiny, unique gifts, or special lineage. The trope is similar to the hero's journey template, where the main difference is that The Chosen One usually does not have a choice because of destiny. Chosen One narratives often incorporate bildungsroman, following the personal development of a character from childhood to adulthood. The character's gifts, lineage or destiny are often unknown at the beginning of the plot or presented to the audience as dramatic irony. The Chosen One trope is rooted in religion, mythology and folklore, and often appears in speculative fiction such as fantasy. The Chosen One trope is comparable to the religious concept of messiah.

== Notable examples ==
- Frodo from The Lord of the Rings
- Paul Atreides from Dune
- Luke Skywalker and Anakin Skywalker from Star Wars
- Link from The Legend of Zelda
- Buffy Summers from Buffy the Vampire Slayer
- Harry Potter from Harry Potter
- Neo from The Matrix
- Po from Kung Fu Panda

== See also ==
- The Hero with a Thousand Faces
- King asleep in mountain
- Christ figure
