= Line in the sand =

Idiom with figurative and literal meanings

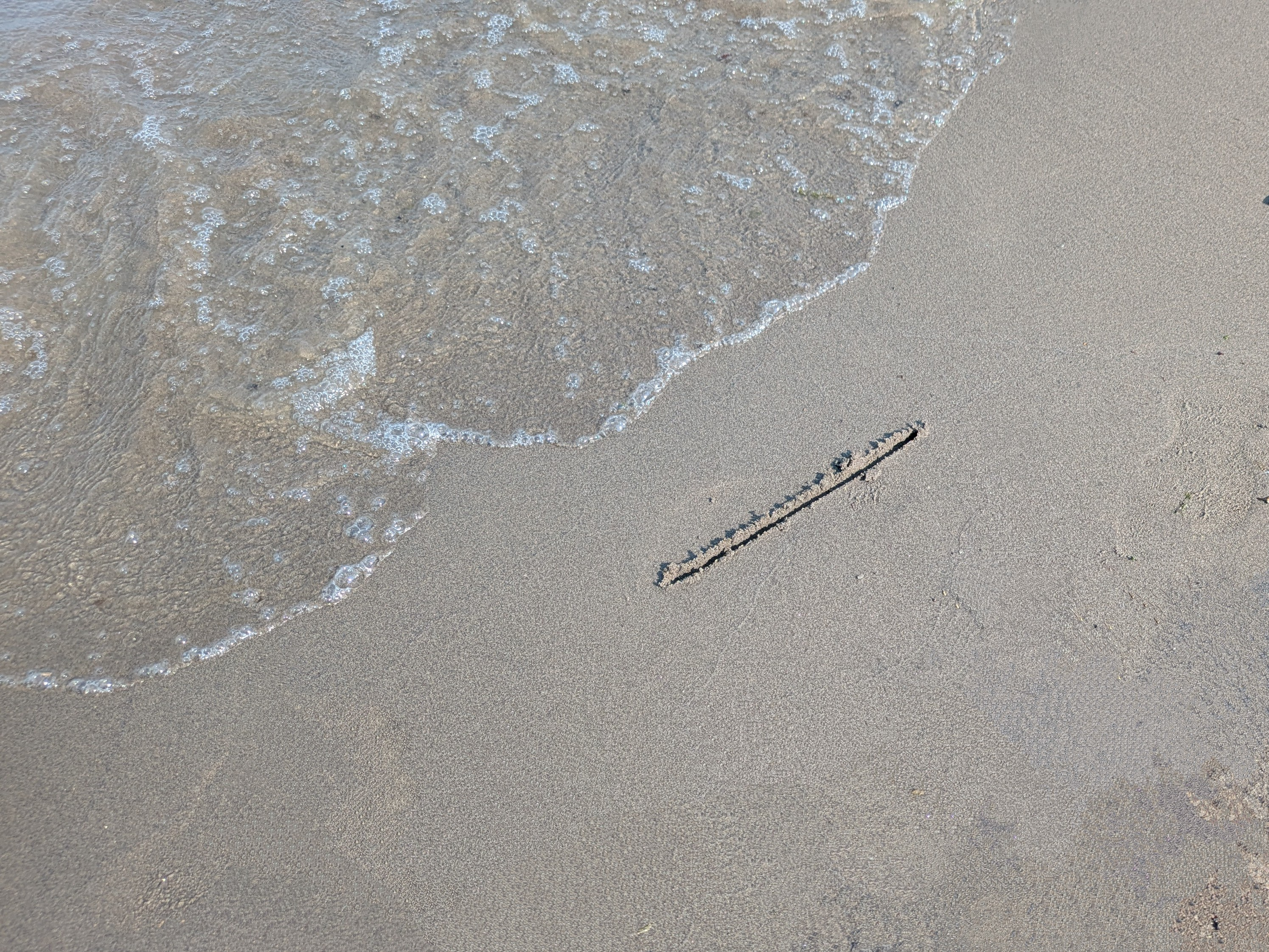
A literal representation of the idiom.

Line in the sand is an idiom, a metaphorical (sometimes literal) point beyond which no further advance will be accepted or made.

Related terms include unilateral boundary setting, red lines and ultimatums to define clear consequences if a line is crossed.

== Origin ==
Biblical link to John 8 (John 8:6). Some have (perhaps erroneously) interpreted Jesus' writing in the sand, as drawing a line in the sand in order to address those who are about to stone a woman caught in adultery. However, the literal translation is not that he drew a line in the sand, but that he "wrote" (or "drew lines" in some translations) in the sand, an important distinction.

The exact origin of the phrase is unknown: the Oxford English Dictionary suggests a transitional use from 1950, but a definitely figurative use only as late as 1978:

He drew a line in the sand with the toe of his boot, and said, 'It's as though I told you "I can punch you in the nose, but you can't reach across that line to hit me back."'

— The Washington Post, 19 December 1950

Notwithstanding the supposed public revulsion toward more federal spending, waste and bureaucracy-building, Congress seems to have gone out of its way to draw a wide line in the sand in front of Carter.

— The Washington Post, 29 October 1978

There is reference to an actual line being drawn in several historical, or legendary, military events:

- One of the earliest recorded instances is in the Indian epic Ramayana where Lakshmana draws a line around the dwelling to protect Sita. This phrase is often used in India even today, and is called Lakshman Rekha.
- In 168 BC, Roman consul Gaius Popillius Laenas drew a circular line in the sand around King Antiochus IV of the Seleucid Empire, then said, "Before you cross this circle I want you to give me a reply for the Roman Senate" – implying that Rome would declare war if the King stepped out of the circle without committing to leave Egypt immediately. Weighing his options, Antiochus wisely decided to withdraw. Only then did Popillius agree to shake hands with him.
- In 1527, during the second expedition for the conquest of Peru, the Governor of Panama sent two ships to Isla de Gallo to rescue Francisco Pizarro and his troops. Pizarro drew a line in the sand, saying: "There lies Peru with its riches; Here, Panama and its poverty. Choose, each man, what best becomes a brave Castilian." Only thirteen men (The Famous Thirteen) continued with Pizarro; the others left for Panama.
- In 1807 or 1808, the Māori tribe Ngāti Whātua won a battle against their Ngāpuhi enemies on a beach at Moremonui in the Northland of New Zealand. One of the victorious chiefs, Taoho, drew a line in the sand with his spear and ordered that no Ngāpuhi were to be slain beyond that point. This battle, the first of the Musket Wars, was called Te Kai a te Karoro (the Feast of the Black-backed Gull) due to the number of bodies left on the beach and eaten by gulls. This battle is also known as Te Haerenga-o-te-one (the Marking of the sand), named after Taoho's act of drawing a line in the sand.
- In the United States, the phrase is most commonly associated with Texas history surrounding the Battle of the Alamo, as it is attributed to Colonel William Travis, commander of the Alamo defence forces. In the waning days of the Battle (somewhere during March 3–5, 1836), with Mexican General Antonio Lopez de Santa Anna having the Alamo completely surrounded, Santa Anna sent a messenger to Travis demanding surrender, or else everyone in the compound would be killed. According to the legend, Travis called the Alamo defenders together, explained that defeat was almost certain, and read the letter of surrender; Travis then (having chosen to die instead of surrender) reportedly pulled his battle sword, used it to draw a line in the ground of the Alamo, and asked for volunteers to cross over the line and join him, understanding their decision would be irreversible. The legend states that all but one of the defenders (including Jim Bowie and Davy Crockett) joined Travis on his side of the line; Tapley Holland would be the first over the line. Moses Rose was the only defender choosing to leave the compound. Travis then responded to Santa Anna's letter with cannon fire, whereupon Santa Anna replied by playing El Degüello.

== In popular culture ==
- In 1990, US president George H. W. Bush described the initiation of the Gulf War as drawing "a line in the sand".
- In 1997, American progressive metal band Dream Theater released a song named "Lines in the Sand" on their album Falling into Infinity.
- In 2003, British rock band Motörhead released a song named "Evolution (Line in the Sand)", which was used as entrance music by WWE wrestling stable Evolution.
- In 2004, an Essendon–Hawthorn game of Australian rules football, unofficially known as the Line in the Sand Match, ended up in a large-scale melee that resulted in 16 weeks' worth of player suspensions and A$70,700 in fines.
- In 2014, American rock band Linkin Park released a song named "A Line in the Sand" on their album The Hunting Party.
- In 2016, English singer-songwriter and musician PJ Harvey released a song named "A Line in the Sand" on her album The Hope Six Demolition Project.

== See also ==
- China's final warning – Russian idiom about a warning with no consequences
- Crossing the Rubicon – Idiom to mean a point of no return
- Letters of last resort – Orders for action in the event of nuclear attack on UK
- Mutual assured destruction – Doctrine of military strategy
- Point of no return – Point beyond which turning back is no longer possible
- Red line (phrase) – Figurative phrase meaning a limit
- Tipping point (sociology) – Point in time when a group rapidly and dramatically changes its behaviour
- Ultimatum – Final demand backed up by a threat
- Window of opportunity – Period of time
