= Red lines in the Russo-Ukrainian war =

Veiled threats of engagement

The term "red lines" (Russian: Красная черта or Красная линия) has seen use in the Russian invasion of Ukraine since 2022. It is a veiled threat of engagement intended to warn an opponent or observer not to interfere or undertake an action or behavior that would "cross the red line".

On 21 April 2021, Russian president Vladimir Putin made a speech in which he repeatedly warned the West of red lines that Russia would not accept. The warnings were repeated on many occasions up to the date of the Russian invasion of Ukraine on 24 February 2022. In particular, Russia identified Ukraine's possible admission to NATO as a "red line". During a December 2021 phone call between U.S. president Joe Biden and President Putin, "Putin told Biden that Ukraine's bid to join NATO must be denied in return for assurances that Russian troops would not carry out an attack." NATO's general secretary Jens Stoltenberg rejected Russia's demand to reverse a 2008 pledge to allow Ukraine to join NATO, stating: "NATO's relationship with Ukraine is going to be decided by the 30 NATO allies and Ukraine, no one else."

There has been a vigorous discussion about what Russia means with its red lines. Some have argued that Russia has reacted, but that Russia's reaction has not been as impressive as it had threatened. Others point out that while Russian high command "is unlikely to try to break through Ukrainian defenses by applying nuclear instruments ... Putin did escalate his nuclear rhetoric in the last weeks of his reelection campaign". Some have said that the threat of nuclear war and the number of red lines that have been crossed reveal the inability of belligerents involved in the war to project power internationally.

== Russia's red lines ==
The mention of red lines has been in everyday use since the beginning of the renewed full scale invasion in Ukraine to justify the war. In February 2022, President Vladimir Putin of the Russian Federation stated that the United States and its Western partners had crossed a red line concerning Ukraine, which resulted in consequence of Russia having to undertake its "Special Military Operation" against Ukraine due to the threat imposed from Ukraine to the very existence of the Russian Federation.

Crossing a red line to the Russian Federation is often identified as damaging Russian national interests. Such actions may include the imposition of sanctions, the freezing of Russian or affiliated nation funds, and the donation of military goods to its perceived adversaries or others.

While the Russian Federation commonly uses the "red line" phrase in international politics, it has simultaneously used it to shape narratives aimed at domestic audiences.

In June 2023, President Putin said that Russia would keep responding to breaches of its red lines. President Putin has been consistent about the threat of nuclear action being used solely in the event of crossing the red line of an existential threat to the state.

In 2023, Russia made 15 official "red line" statements, compared to 24 in 2022.

== Usage of red line warnings ==
Russia has used the phrase "red line" often, and because some of these lines have been crossed without major repercussions, some believe that Russia has devalued the impact of their threats, with the threats appearing more as bluffs.

There may be an actual red line that Russia and the Kremlin have, but it is largely unclear what it consists of.

Some of the red-line threats from Russia may be bluffs solely to slow the supply of resources to Ukraine, making the West consider their options and delaying action.

Others may be used to show that an escalation has occurred once a line is crossed. Red lines are nearly always soft, variable, and adjustable rather than immutable hard-line positions.

Russia and Ukraine have mentioned red lines regarding acceptable peace terms in diplomacy. One such example of a diplomatic Russian red line leaves Russia keeping Crimea, and another Ukrainian red line sees all Russian forces leave the territory that belonged to Ukraine on 31 December 1991. These red lines appear incompatible.

=== Tacit rules ===
As time has progressed in the war, a set of implicit rules has emerged which fit between current operations and red lines and affect the rule creator.

Examples of such tacit rules include:

- NATO will defend its territory.
- No NATO forces will operate inside Ukraine against Russian forces.
- NATO will not operate in the airspace over Ukraine to avoid a confrontation.

Under these stated rules, Russia would cross a red line if they attacked a NATO country, and NATO would cross a self-imposed red line if they sent troops into Ukraine. The above aims to limit an expansion of the war; however, it is not all one-sided, as other tacit rules are:

- The US and NATO will share intelligence and satellite imagery with Ukraine.
- NATO countries will provide weapons and ammunition to Ukraine.
- Ukraine will not use NATO weapons to strike inside Russia's pre-2014 borders. As of November 2024 this is no longer the case.

== Identified red lines ==
=== Russian red lines ===
Date notified	Red line	Date crossed	Consequences	Ref.
2014	Ukraine not to launch an incursion into Russian-occupied Crimea	August 23, 2023		
September 2021	Ukraine not joining NATO	not crossed yet		
September 2021	NATO military infrastructure not to be deployed in Ukraine	not crossed yet		
September 2021	No deployment of soldiers to Ukraine	April 12, 2023		
December 2021	No weapons to Ukraine	February 2022	Comments over non-disguised intervention by NATO	
February 24, 2022	“Interference” in Ukraine by outside powers	February 24, 2022	Reduction in gas supply to the west	
February 2022	NATO troops and missiles to be withdrawn from Russia's western border	February 2022		
February 2022	NATO to stop eastward expansion and reverses back to position in 1997	February 2022		
March 2022	No introducing a “no-fly” zone	not crossed yet		
March 2022	No more Western arms to Ukraine	March 2022	Comments about convoys to be considered legitimate targets	
March 2022	No MiG-29 fighter jets	March 2022	Comments about supplied MiGs to be destroyed	
April 2022	No direct foreign intervention in war	not crossed yet		
June 2022	No long-range missiles	June 2022	New targets hit by Russian missiles	
June 2022	No Western-made missiles to be fired into Russia	December 2023		
August 2022	No supplying old Soviet tanks to Ukraine	August 2022		
September 2022	Germany's supply of lethal weapons to Ukraine crosses a red line	September 2022		
September 2022	Russian setbacks on the battlefield will result in a nuclear holocaust	September 2022		
September 2022	Not to threaten the territorial integrity of Russia (as its borders were before 2014)	August 6, 2024	None	
September 2022	Not to supply longer range battlefield missiles (greater than HIMARS's current 80 kilometres (50 mi))	May 2023	Red line pulled back	
November 2022	Not to supply Patriot Missile system	April 2023		
January 2023	No modern Western tanks to be supplied to Ukraine	January 2023	Comments about it being an "extremely dangerous" action	
March 2023	No depleted uranium ammunition for Challenger 2 tanks	April 2024	Claims that Russia would be "forced to react" if Ukraine is delivered weapons with a "nuclear component".	
May 2023	No F-16 fighter jets	July 2024	Comments about it being a "colossal risk"	
June 2023	No HIMARS or Storm Shadow missiles to attack Russian territory (as its borders were before 2014)	June 2024		
September 2023	No US ATACMS long-range missiles to attack Russian troops	October 17, 2023	Comment by Putin that US deliveries of the long-range Army Tactical Missile System (ATACMS) to Ukraine were "another mistake"	
September 28, 2024	No long range missiles to strike deep into Russian territory, Putin said he would consider a nuclear response to such action	November 20, 2024	Changes to Russian nuclear doctrine, an attack from a non-nuclear power with the backing of a nuclear power would be considered a joint attack; a large attack on Russia or Belarus with conventional munitions would now qualify for a nuclear response	

Current red lines

=== Western red lines ===
Date notified	Red line	Date crossed	Consequences	Ref.
2021	Russia not to invade Ukraine	February 2022	Immediate sanctions	
February 2022	No threats against a NATO country	several times against Poland and Baltic countries		
February 2022	Not to surrender the independent right of any country to apply to join NATO	February 2024 (the U.S. agreed in principle not to let Ukraine into NATO)		
March 2022	No chemical weapons	May 1, 2024		
International law	No murder and abduction of children	March 2022	International Criminal Court arrest warrants for Vladimir Putin and Maria Lvova-Belova	
NATO rules	Not to interfere with civilian ships belonging to NATO countries in the Black Sea; Russian warships stop and board NATO member civilian ship (Turkish) in international waters	August 2023	NATO warships from Romania and Bulgaria patrol and sweep the Ukrainian grain corridor for mines	

== Tactics used to contravene red lines ==
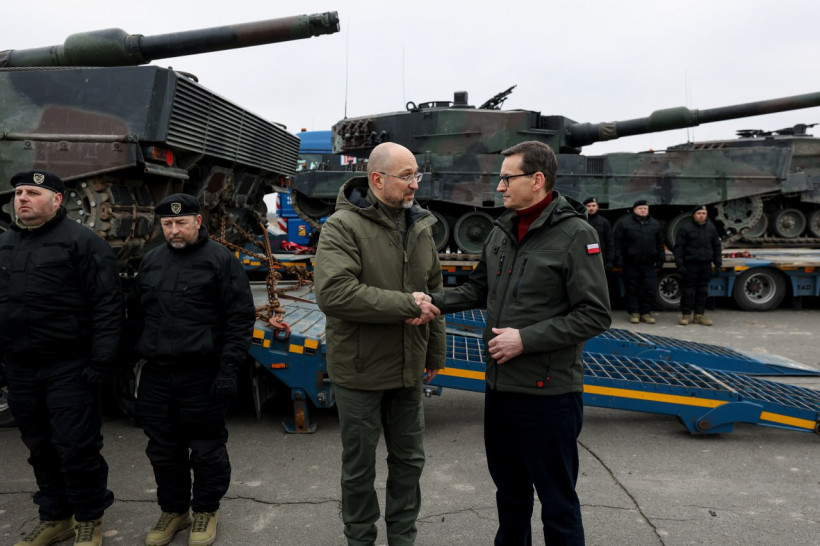
The handover of the first Leopard 2 tanks provided by Poland to Ukraine in February 2023

Red lines come in differing levels of severity. Some of these are bluffs, with parties to the conflict having given many red lines transcended without issue during the last decade. Belligerents and non-belligerents alike have employed several tactics to counter red-line policies. Such counter-measures aim to allow the crossing of red lines with significantly fewer or no consequences.

Noise
The West has often employed a tactic of "noise" before a decision is taken to cross a Russian red line. This noise is often employed in the form of a public debate involving numerous countries, frequently over a month or even longer. Often, these debates involve the possibility of the first weapon being sent from, or via, a third country. Once this has occurred and a few arms have arrived, the red line has effectively been diluted without a significant reaction. Because of the noise surrounding the discussions, no single event can be seen as significant or important enough to be defined as the red-line crossing moment.
Undermining the red line
Another tactic used is supplying something similar to a red line weapon, such as the supply of modern tanks. For example, when France agreed to supply several AMX-10 RC wheeled modern "tanks". These wheeled tanks were not exactly what Ukraine wanted or needed. As a result, it caused a minimal reaction from the Russian Federation while enabling the ability to further dilute the debate of whether it was wheeled vehicles or tracked vehicles that the Russian Federation objected to rather than the fact it was a "modern Western" tank. Following this, Challenger 2 tanks were then promised in addition to modern Leopard 2 and M1 Abrams tanks.
Similar, but not as good
With long-range missiles, the Russian Federation objected to the United States of America supplying ATACMS with a range of 300 km, as Ukraine could use the missiles to attack targets in Russia. In response to this, the United Kingdom supplied its "Storm Shadow" cruise missiles with a range of 250 km. These weapons allowed Ukraine to strike into Russian-held territory in Eastern Ukraine while also having enough range to hit valuable targets within the legal borders of the Russian Federation. This capacity enables Ukraine to destroy command and logistics centers located in occupied Ukraine that Russia had previously moved back out of HIMARS range. The Russian Federation, having a hard-line on the 300 km range, found its red line diluted, and there was no tangible reaction.
Drip feed
A decision to supply a large number of modern tanks would likely provoke an immediate reaction from the Russian Federation; however, when a decision is made for a country to supply a number as small as four tanks, another country may supply seven, and a third country another four. If aid is given in this manner, Russia seems unable to show that a red line has been crossed. By drip-feeding from multiple countries, no one country attracts a significant adverse reaction from what is effectively directly crossing a red line.
Calling the bluff
Belligerents have few options to retaliate meaningfully against other parties for a breach of red-lines without significantly widening the scope of the war or resorting to a nuclear option.

== Effect of red lines ==
Red lines set by Russia have affected NATO member-state decisions concerning Ukraine. For example, the United Kingdom—apart from refusing to have British soldiers participate—has supplied most pieces of equipment and undertaken training missions that they are in a position to do; however, many other countries have shown timidity and concern over the red lines, resulting in a lack of, or delay in, providing assistance to Ukraine.

Certain chemical weapons being deployed by Russia are pushing the boundaries of Western red lines, as is the treatment of civilians, especially Ukrainian children.

== Red lines of non-belligerent states ==
Many countries outside of the direct belligerents active in the Russo-Ukrainian war have interests within it. As a result, foreign parties such as the United Kingdom, the United States, and the People's Republic of China have established their own so-called red lines.

When the international community refers to the crossing of "red lines", it tends to be limited to the use of nuclear, chemical, or biological weapons and the supply of other lethal weapons. Below, a small list of such red lines has been provided.

- The United States warned China not to supply lethal weapons to Russia, or else it would face secondary sanctions.
- Russia warned South Korea that supplying weapons to Ukraine would cross a red line, as Russia would respond by supplying weapons to North Korea.
- The European Council of the European Union implicitly drew a red line when the authorities of Georgia rejected a judicial reform and European Union loan package to reduce the influence of pro-Russia billionaires in the country by offering EU membership candidate status to Ukraine and Moldova (but not Georgia) in June 2022.
- Iran was warned that supplying missiles to Russia would cross a red line resulting in secondary sanctions.
- China has told Russia it would cross a red line by using nuclear weapons in Ukraine, whereby China would stop implicitly supporting Russia in the war.

== See also ==
- List of military aid to Ukraine during the Russo-Ukrainian War
- Timeline of the Russian invasion of Ukraine
- China's final warning, a mocking term for "red lines" that hold no real consequences
- Trump Always Chickens Out, a mocking abbreviation used for Trump's repeated lack of deadline enforcements during the 2026 Iran war
