= Economic policy of the second Trump administration =

Under the second presidency of Donald Trump, the federal government of the United States has pursued an economic policy focused on lower taxation, deregulation, and large-scale protective tariffs. Trump nominated Howard Lutnick as the United States secretary of commerce, Scott Bessent as the United States secretary of the treasury, and Russell Vought as the director of the Office of Management and Budget (OMB), all of whom were confirmed by the U.S. Senate. When Donald Trump took office as president in January 2025, the economy of the United States had increasing economic growth, low unemployment, and declining inflation in the aftermath of the 2021–2023 inflation surge.

To cut the United States's federal budget, Trump established the Department of Government Efficiency (DOGE), led by Elon Musk. DOGE employees have vastly cut spending at various federal agencies, and have attempted to dismantle nearly all of the functions of the United States Agency for International Development and the Consumer Financial Protection Bureau. In January 2025, the OMB briefly issued a pause to all grants and loans from the federal government.

Much of Trump's domestic economic agenda has centered around the extension of the Tax Cuts and Jobs Act of 2017, which was passed during his first presidential term. Trump has also pledged to remove taxes on tips, overtime pay, and Social Security benefits, though all of his proposals face resistance from Congress, with the tax cuts likely to increase the U.S. national debt by trillions of dollars if not offset by politically unpopular cuts to spending. He sought greater government control over private businesses, abandoning traditional conservative free market orthodoxy in favor of state capitalism by taking direct government equity stakes in major US corporations. Trump also imposed steep protectionist tariffs against nearly every country in an effort to correct U.S. trade deficits and promote manufacturing in the U.S., significantly escalating the China–U.S. trade war and beginning trade wars with Canada and Mexico. The reaction to Trump's tariffs, including his April 2025 decision to impose a universal 10 percent tariff on nearly all countries and higher rates on many other countries, led to a stock market crash. His economic policies and frequent tariff announcements and pauses led to market volatility and the emergence of a "Sell America" investment trend.

Trump has been described as trying "to achieve most of his policy goals through threats and attacks, not a meaningful dialogue on policy with Congress". His immigration policies, broad tariffs, and the fuel crisis from the 2026 Iran war caused by Trump have all contributed to a significant slowdown of the US economy. The One Big Beautiful Bill Act, passed by Trump and the Republican-led Congress, severely reduced government revenue in the long term, created drastic cuts to food stamps and Medicaid spending, and helped to increase the US national debt trajectory by $10 trillion by 2028.

== Background and campaign ==
Donald Trump, previously the president of the United States from 2017 to 2021, campaigned in 2024 on the promise of an economic nationalist system characterized by protective tariffs, lower taxation, and reduced regulations, where income tax would be largely or completely replaced by tariffs on other countries to defend local manufacturing. In his first presidency, Trump had also focused on protectionism. In 2024, he vowed to enact even higher tariffs than those imposed in his first term, including a universal baseline tariff of 10 to 20 percent, and high tariffs on China, Mexico, and all cars imported to the United States. He proposed a four-year transition away from essential goods imported from China and sought to transform the U.S. into a self-sufficient economy. Trump pledged to extend and expand the 2017 tax cuts passed during his first term, and promised to remove taxes on tips, overtime, and Social Security benefits. Trump also pledged to devalue the U.S. dollar to cheapen American exports.

Trump campaigned against the 2021–2023 inflation surge that followed the COVID-19 pandemic in the United States, for which he blamed his successor, President Joe Biden. Trump's victory in the 2024 U.S. presidential election was attributed in part to voters' dissatisfaction with the Biden administration's handling of inflation. Many economists criticized the Trump campaign's economic agenda for potentially leading to an increase in inflation and the addition of around US$15 trillion to the United States's national debt. Ahead of Trump's inauguration on January 20, 2025, the economy of the United States had increasing economic growth, low unemployment, and declining inflation by statistics.

== Personnel ==
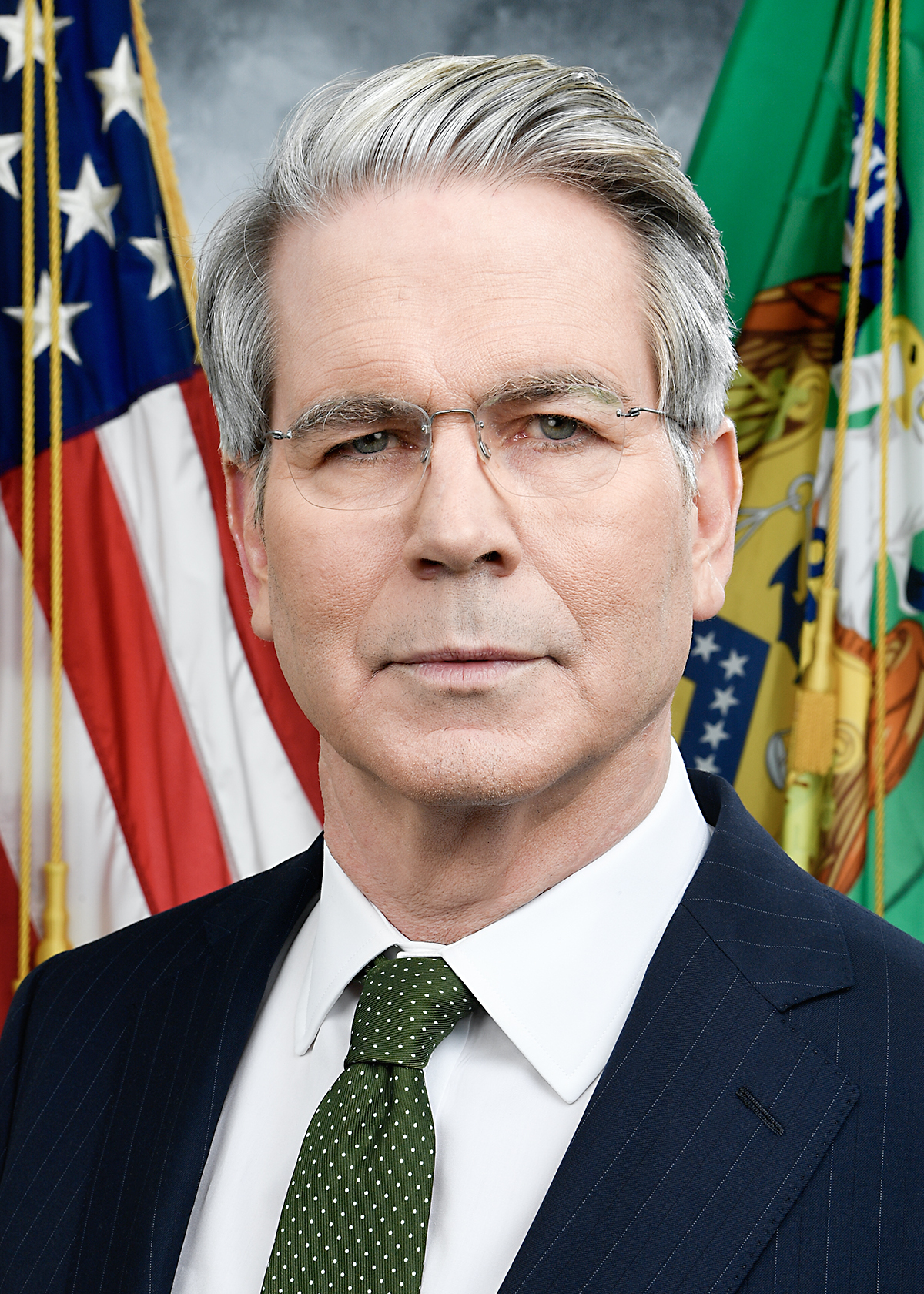
Scott Bessent, the U.S. secretary of the treasury

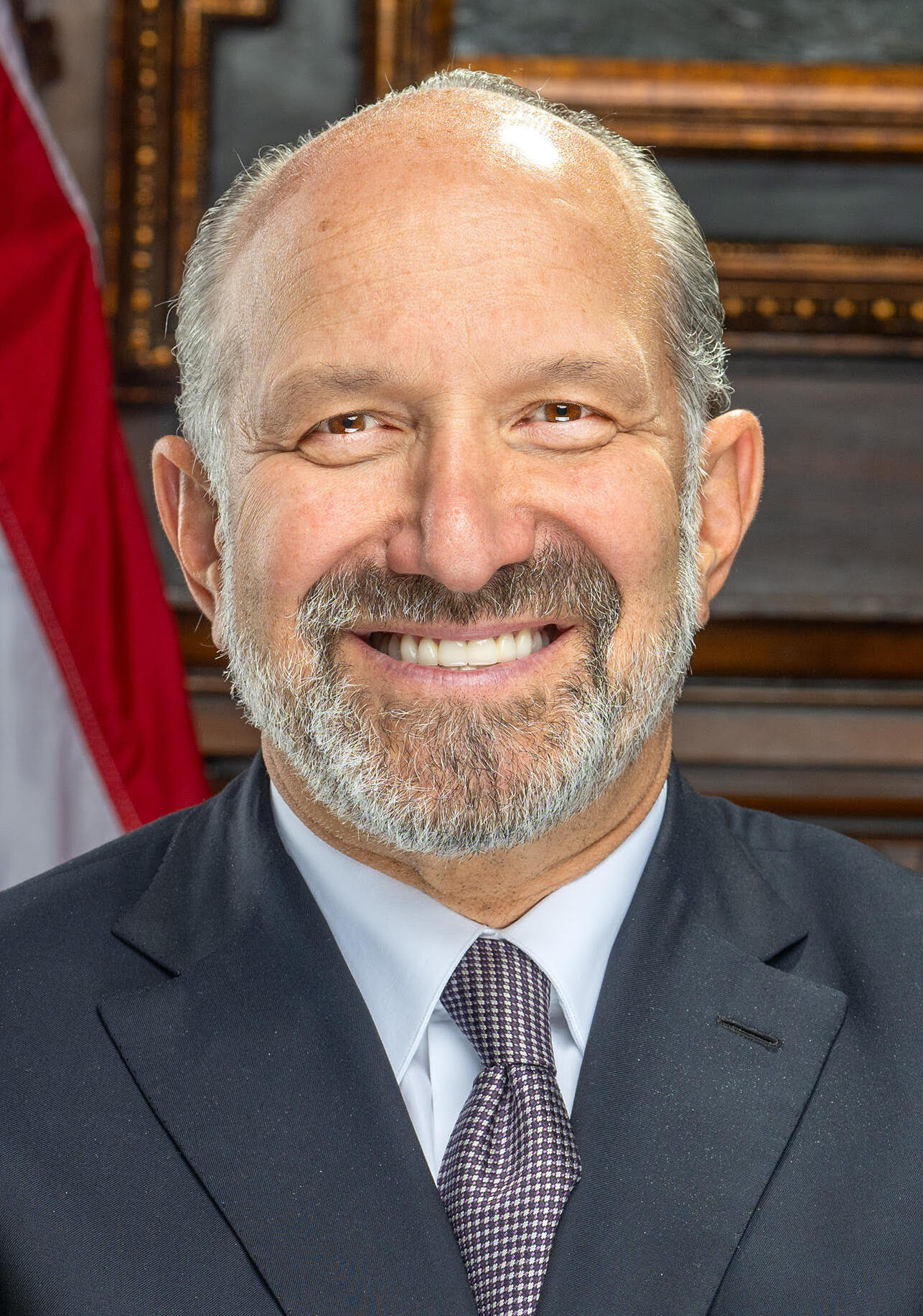
Howard Lutnick, the U.S. secretary of commerce

In November 2024, as president-elect, Trump nominated several officials to serve in his cabinet during his second presidency. He nominated Howard Lutnick as the United States Secretary of Commerce, Scott Bessent as the United States Secretary of the Treasury, and Russell Vought as the director of the Office of Management and Budget (OMB).

On January 16, 2025, Bessent appeared before the Senate Committee on Finance and defended Trump's tariff strategy and said he favored extensions on tax cuts and harsher economic policies against China and Russia. The U.S. Senate voted 68–29 to confirm Bessent as treasury secretary on January 27. The Senate Committee on the Budget approved Vought's nomination on January 30 in an 11–0 vote that was boycotted by all nine Democratic Party members and the one independent on the committee. The full Senate voted 53–47 on February 6 to confirm him as the OMB director. On February 18, the Senate voted 51–45 to confirm Lutnick as the commerce secretary, and he was sworn in to the role three days later, on February 21.

Trump has worked to oust Erika McEntarfer and Lisa Cook. (Note: Trump v. Cook)

== Budget and spending ==
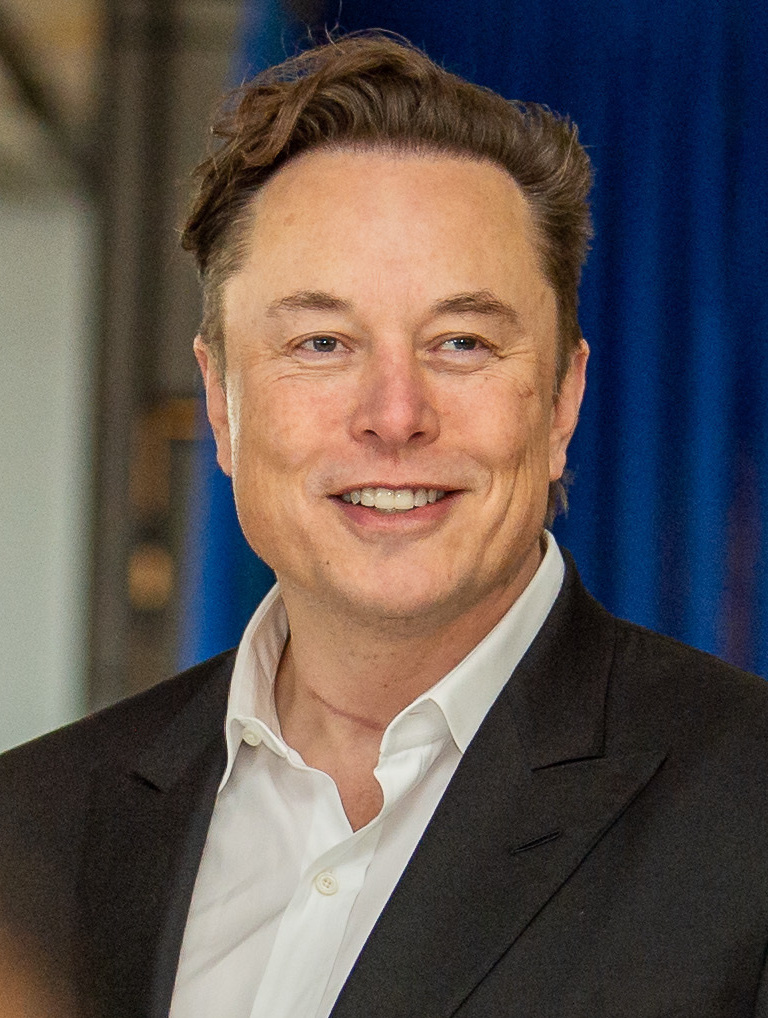
Elon Musk, the de facto leader of the Department of Government Efficiency

Trump established the Department of Government Efficiency (DOGE), an initiative tasked with cutting federal government spending. DOGE is de facto led by businessman Elon Musk, who officially serves as senior advisor to the president. DOGE members have filled influential roles at federal agencies and sought to vastly cut their spending, facilitating mass layoffs of federal government employees and the dismantling of federal agencies. Layoffs primarily focused on probationary employees, with nearly 10,000 federal employees fired by February 2025. Musk initially said that DOGE would cut $2 trillion from the United States federal budget, which he first revised to $1 trillion, and later to $150 billion. DOGE said in April 2025 that it had saved $160 billion; an analysis has suggested that its cuts and firings have cost $135 billion, and evidence has emerged of errors in DOGE's accounting that incorrectly inflates the amount of money it has saved.

Trump and DOGE have attempted to dismantle the vast majority of the United States Agency for International Development (USAID). USAID, which employed around 10,000 people, was originally tasked to carry out and monitor worldwide humanitarian projects, though some have criticized it for contributing to projects that are not humanitarian in nature and for mismanaging its funding. Vought was also made the acting director of the Consumer Financial Protection Bureau (CFPB) upon becoming OMB director, and he worked to shut down much of the CFPB's operations. (Note: The CFPB is an independent agency created by the US Congress which Trump has sought greater control over.: The president is generally understood to not have the ability to amend or repeal congressional actions. However, the US Supreme Court has lifted lower court rulings that the administration can't close congressionally created agencies (see List of significant shadow docket decisions made by the United States Supreme Court § Government employees).) In February 2025, Trump directed the treasury secretary to end production of the U.S. penny.

Trump appointed allies of him and Musk to the United States Office of Personnel Management (OPM) and the General Services Administration (GSA) to facilitate planned spending cuts. In January 2025, the OPM offered employees of the federal government a deferred resignation program in which they could receive their salary and benefits through September 2025 if they resigned before February 6. Musk and DOGE gained access to the payment system of the U.S. Department of the Treasury. Opposition to DOGE has resulted in numerous lawsuits challenging the legality and constitutionality of its actions.

=== Federal government grant pause ===
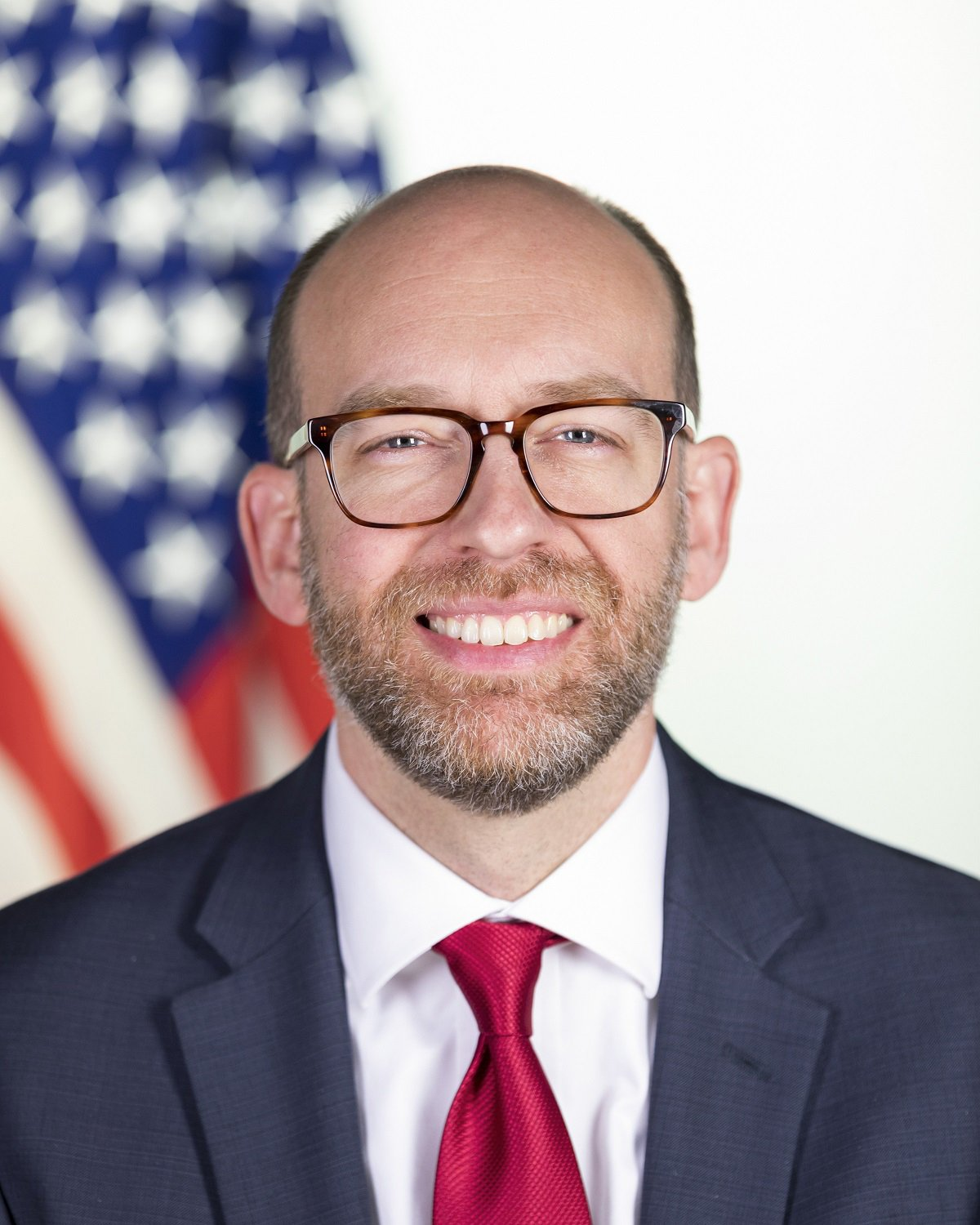
Russell Vought, the director of the Office of Management and Budget

On January 27, 2025, the OMB issued a temporary pause to all grants and loans from the federal government to 2,600 programs, in order to "determine the best uses of the funding" that was "consistent with the law and [Trump's] priorities". The OMB later said that the pause would exclude "any program that provides direct benefits to Americans", such as Medicaid, the Supplemental Nutrition Assistance Program, Pell Grants, and funding for small businesses and farmers. The pause created uncertainty among government employees, lawmakers, and other organizations, and the OMB rescinded the memo authorizing it on January 29. The federal grant pause was blocked by a federal judge in February following lawsuits against it. A judge ordered the Trump administration to "immediately restore frozen funding" on February 10, finding that the government had "improperly" frozen them.

=== Trump dividend ===
In 2026, Donald Trump promised that every American citizen would receive a $5,000 payment if Republicans keep control of Congress after 2026 United States House of Representatives elections. He made this announcement during a speech at the Republican National Committee's convention in Dallas; however, in his speech, he did not say whether he would need Congressional approval for these payments, which he referred to as the "Trump Dividend". And giving money to American citizens is not a novel idea, as Trump previously proposed sending $2,000 dividend checks funded by tariffs. JD Vance tied the plan to provide a $5,000 dividend to the revenue generated from US tariffs on imported goods, describing it as a "dividend for American workers". Bernie Moreno announced that he will introduce a bill to guarantee the passage of the Trump Dividend as soon as possible after the November 3rd election. With confidence that Republicans will emerge victorious, Moreno believes that the bill's passage will have a positive impact on America. Democratic leaders lashed out with strong criticism at Trump's proposal. Gavin Newsom harshly criticized Trump, saying that after making people sicker and poorer because of his actions, Trump is now trying to buy their votes with $5,000 in taxpayer-funded money.

== Affordability ==
Trump says "the word affordability is a con job by the Democrats (...) the word affordability is a Democrat scam"

The retail price of gasoline in the US increased at the outbreak of war in Iran. In late April 2026, Trump said Americans should expect higher gas prices for "a little while".

The retail price of diesel fuel in the US increased at the outbreak of war in Ukraine and Iran.

Trump has often confused a decrease in the rate of inflation (disinflation) with prices decreasing (deflation).

Starting in November 2025, Trump increased attention on affordability while being described as out of touch, "On social media, Mr. Trump posted incessantly about the new Lincoln bathroom, remodeled in black and white marble with gold faucets and light fixtures, and on renovations at the Kennedy Center, which he said would be outfitted in marble and "magnificent high end carpeting."" Trump called affordability a "hoax" and "a Democrat scam" for several weeks before acknowledging the issue in 2026.

According to a CNN poll, 70 percent of Americans believe that Donald Trump is handling the economy poorly. This marks a significant shift from his first term, when CNN data showed that disapproval of his economic performance never rose above 50 percent. In the current poll, only 30 percent of respondents approve of Trump’s handling of the economy. Disapproval is nearly universal among Democrats, at 97 percent, but it is also high among independents (79 percent) and notable even among members of his own party, with 30 percent of Republicans expressing dissatisfaction. Additionally, 65 percent of Americans say that Trump’s policies have worsened economic conditions, and 77 percent report that these policies have increased the cost of living in their communities.

=== Trump calls for 10% cap on credit card interest ===
In early January 2026, President Trump called for capping credit card interest at 10%. In contrast, Reuters reports that the average American consumer pays more than 19% interest.

However, Wall Street analysts say that such a cap would require legislation from Congress which they estimate has “slim odds” of passing. Furthermore, this might lead to a pullback in credit card lending.

An AP–NORC survey conducted in October 2026 found that 85% of voters considered the economy one of the most important issues in deciding their vote in the midterm elections. The cost of living was cited by 84% of respondents, while 64% cited the war with Iran. The survey also found that 74% disapproved of President Donald Trump's handling of the economy and 79% disapproved of his handling of the cost of living. The findings showed that economic concerns and the war were both prominent issues for voters ahead of the elections, but did not establish that the war alone accounted for dissatisfaction with the economy.

== Agriculture ==
On October 19, 2026, the Trump administration introduced a comprehensive support package valued at $8 billion to mitigate the financial burdens faced by American agricultural producers in the context of heightened diesel fuel costs during the harvest season. The Harvest Fuel Relief Program, a collaborative effort between the United States Department of Agriculture (USDA) and the federal government, was launched with Trump crediting the initiative's progress to the diligence of Republican Senator Roger Marshall of Kansas. Furthermore, the USDA subsequently clarified that the $8 billion allocation would be utilized to provide one-time financial assistance to American farmers during the harvest season, with the objective of addressing temporary market fluctuations and increased input costs, thereby promoting economic stability in the agricultural sector.

== Interference in private business ==
Trump sought a great amount of control over US business, publicly attacked companies and their executives, demanded firings of corporate leaders who criticized or contradicted him, and demanded cuts of profits for the federal government. His administration confirmed that it maintained a loyalty scorecard for 553 American companies based on their "support of present and future administration initiatives".

Trump abandoned traditional Republican orthodoxy about protecting and promoting the free market, and sought greater and direct government control over private business which was widely described by academics, economists, commentators, and former corporate CEOs as an embrace of right-wing socialism, Chinese Communism, or state capitalism. His demand and agreement with NVIDIA and AMD to provide the government with 15% of all overseas chip sales to China were described by critics as a "shakedown" and as potentially illegal and unconstitutional.

In an unprecedented move, the Pentagon became the largest shareholder of MP Materials, bypassing US procurement and contracting laws in the process. As part of an agreement to allow Japan-based Nippon Steel buy US Steel, Trump was granted a personal, not governmental, golden share in US Steel, allowing him to influence board decisions and maintain veto power over certain decisions set to expire at the end of his presidential term, after which the Treasury and Commerce Departments would exercise control under all future presidents. Intel agreed to grant the government a 10% equity stake in its company with no power to influence board decisions "with limited exceptions" in what NBC News described as "the president's latest extraordinary move to exert federal government control over private business".

Writing for Time magazine in 2024, Jeffrey Sonnenfeld described Trump's moves against capitalism from his first term as sharing "more in common with far-left progressive positions than with traditional GOP views, and are often far more progressive than the Biden Administration" and wrote that he expected such attacks to continue into his second term. In February 2026, the New York Times contrasted Trump's economic policies with those of Mitt Romney, the previous Republican presidential nominee before Trump. It described Trump's economic ideology as similar to dirigisme, used in some countries such as France.

Trump is not a capitalist. He is a socialist in sheep’s clothing

— Luigi Zingales

== Taxation and deficits ==
In order to extend Trump's 2017 tax cuts, Republican Party members in Congress began considering cuts to various social programs, including Medicare. In January 2025, the Congressional Budget Office estimated than a 10-year extension of the tax cuts would increase the U.S. federal government deficit by over $4 trillion if not offset by spending cuts, and the elimination of federal taxes on Social Security benefits, tips, and overtime income would further increase the national debt. Trump's proposal of enacting much of his legislative agenda with a single bill has led to resistance in Congress, with fiscally conservative Republicans objecting to the tax cuts without corresponding spending cuts, and moderate Republicans opposing any bill with significant cuts to Medicare and Medicaid. In February 2025, Trump signed an executive order directing the creation of a U.S. sovereign wealth fund before 2026, though such funds are typically funded by budgetary surpluses, which the U.S. does not have.

== Trade and tariffs ==
Upon imposing the highest U.S. tariffs since the Great Depression (called "Liberation Day" in April 2025), Trump claimed that "jobs and factories will come roaring back". However, manufacturing employment declined every month for the rest of the year.

Though Trump claimed in December 2025 that "inflation has stopped", the consumer price index (CPI) began increasing in the months following his April 2025 announcement of tariffs.

Consumer sentiment declined during the early part of Trump's second term. The University of Michigan Index of Consumer Sentiment reached a record low in April 2026.

Trump asserted tariffs on Chinese goods in February and April 2025, igniting a trade war that injected uncertainty as China turned to other sources.

In January 2026, the US dollar reached its lowest point in four years. A lower dollar makes US goods less expensive abroad, but it also makes foreign products more expensive in the US and thus tends to increase inflation.

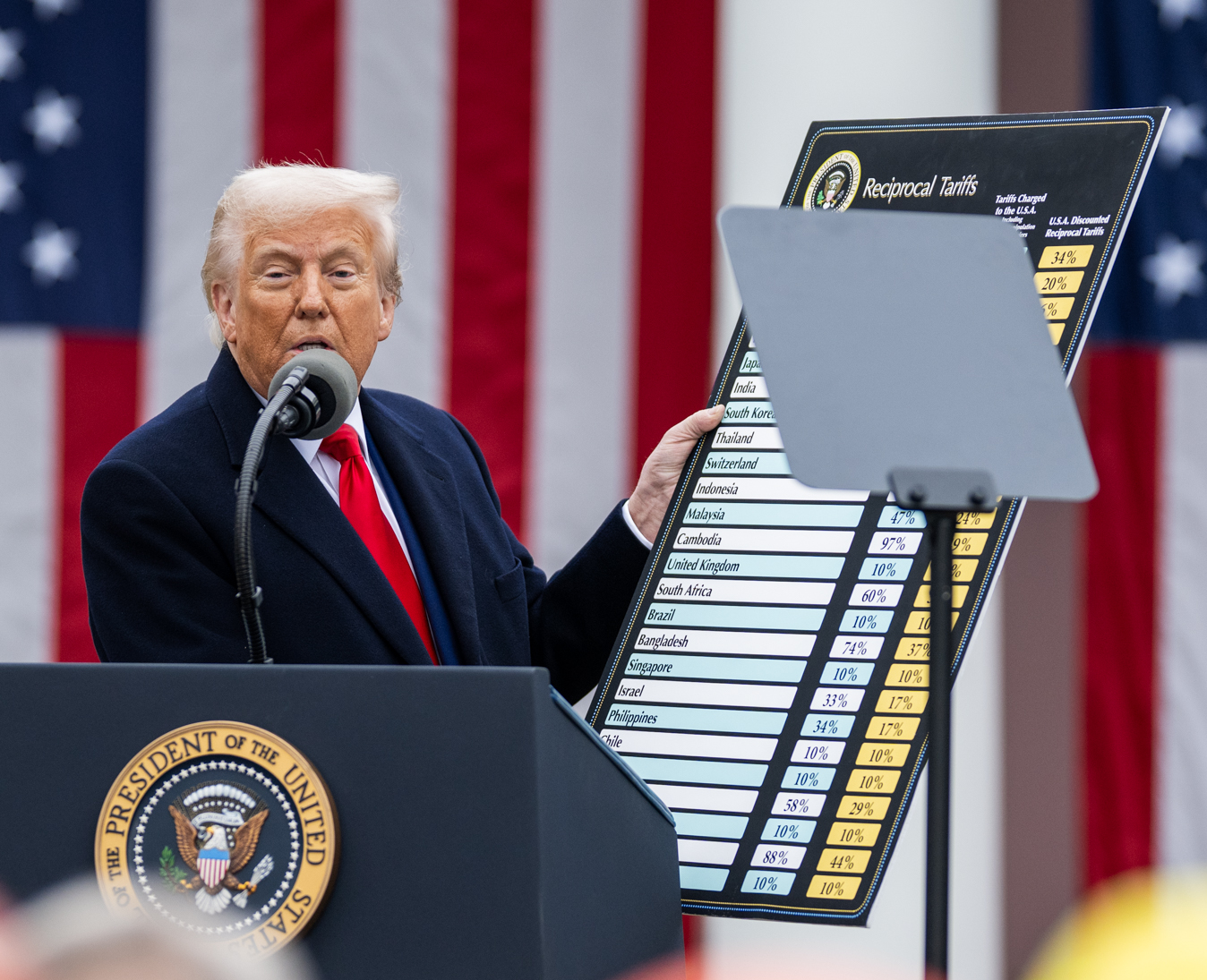
Trump presenting a chart detailing "Liberation Day" tariff rates for many countries in April 2025

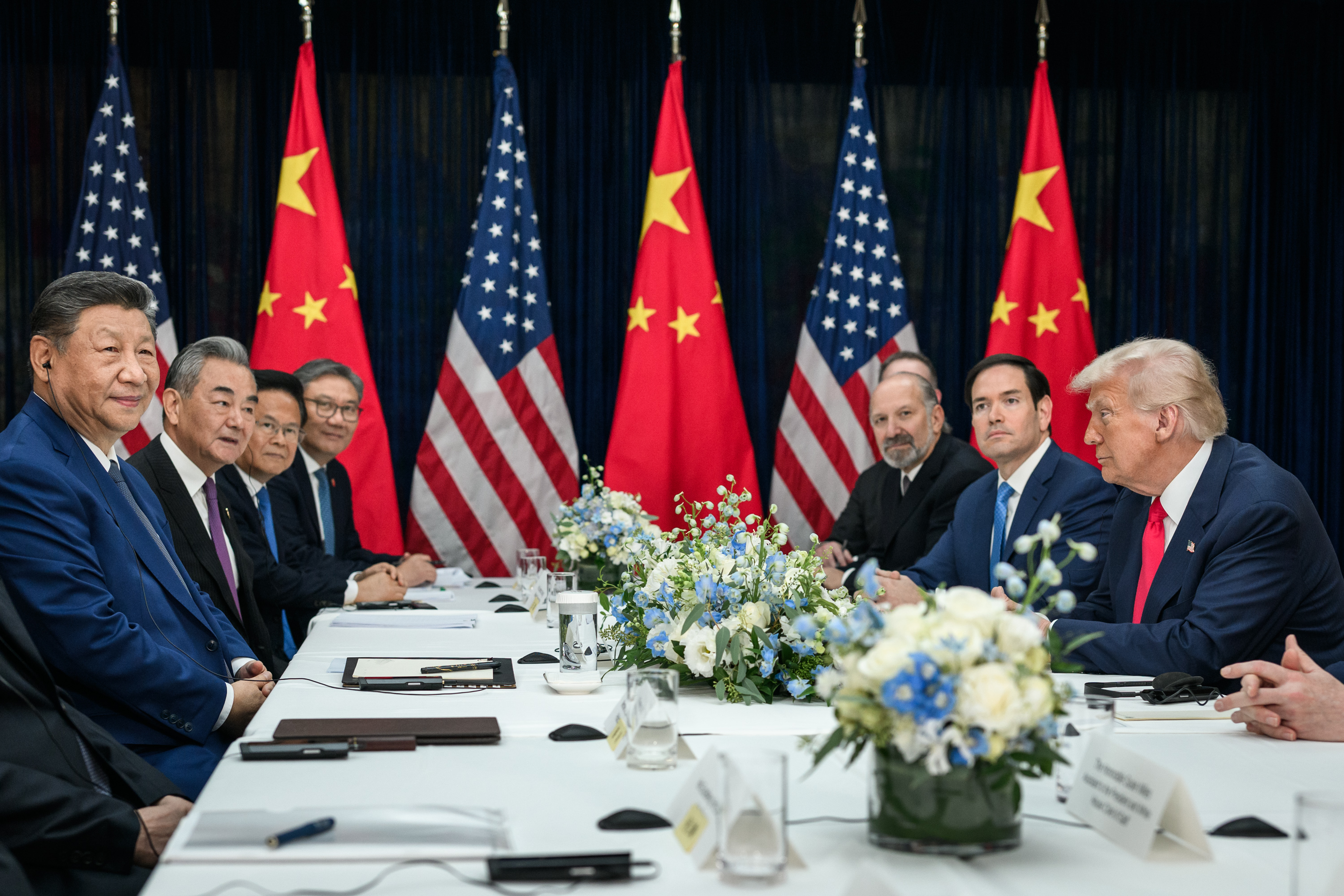
Talks between U.S. delegation headed by Trump and Chinese delegation headed by Xi at the summit meeting in Busan, October 2025

Trump enacted a series of steep protectionist tariffs against nearly every country, raising the United States's effective tariff rate from 2.5 percent to 27 percent by April 2025. He began trade wars with Canada and Mexico by imposing near-universal tariffs of 25 percent against both countries in March 2025 after a one-month delay. Canada imposed retaliatory tariffs on the U.S., and Trump later indefinitely delayed tariffs on goods compliant with the United States–Mexico–Canada Agreement on free trade between the countries.

Trump justified his tariff policy because of the United States's large trade deficits with many nations and a desire to promote manufacturing in the United States that had been lost to offshoring. When imposing tariffs on Canada and Mexico, he cited the influx in illegal immigrants crossing the U.S. borders with Mexico and with Canada, as well as the opioid epidemic in the United States fueled by fentanyl originating in China reaching the U.S. through Mexico and Canada.

Trump also imposed a universal 10 percent tariff on China in February 2025, which were raised to 20 percent in March, escalating the China–United States trade war. On March 12, he imposed 25 percent tariffs on all steel and aluminum entering the United States, and later that month the announced universal 25 percent tariffs on automobiles and automobile parts, which came into effect on April 3.

On April 2, 2025, Trump announced universal 10 percent tariffs on nearly every country, with higher rates on 57 other countries. The 10 percent tariffs took effect on April 5, and the variable tariffs on other countries took effect on April 9, but were delayed for 90 days shortly after they entered force for all countries except for China, which Trump further raised tariffs on. China responded with retaliatory tariffs of 84 percent on American goods. By April 11, U.S. tariffs on Chinese goods reached 145 percent, while Chinese tariffs on American goods reached 125 percent. That day, Trump announced that U.S. tariffs on all countries would exclude consumer electronics, though electronics from China would retain a 20 percent tariff.

The U.S. dollar has experienced a significant decline since March 2025, primarily due to tariffs negatively impacting economic growth.Trump's announcement of "Liberation Day" in April contributed to a further decrease in its value. Since mid-May, the dollar's decline has persisted, with some attributing this trend to the appointment of a new Federal Reserve chairman and Trump's advocacy for reduced interest rates.

Over the course of the 2026 Iran war, Trump had engaged in "jawboning" the oil markets to suppress oil prices by posting "positive" news in his Truth Social account, sparking concerns of longer-term supply issues. Later in June, Trump accused gas companies of supposedly "gouging" the prices of gas against lower oil prices.

=== Stock market ===
Trump's economic policies and frequent tariff announcements and pauses spurred market volatility and the emergence of the "Sell America" investment trend on Wall Street.

On March 9, 2025, Trump declined to say whether his policies could lead to a recession in the United States. He said in an interview with Fox News that it would take time to see the payoff from his policies, but that they would ultimately be worthwhile, saying "If you look at China, they have a 100-year perspective. We have a quarter. We go by quarters, and you can't go by that. You have to do what's right." In the following days, the S&P 500, Nasdaq-100, and Russell 2000 indices entered corrections, which are defined as a fall in a stock market index of over 10 percent from its peak. After Trump's April 2 tariffs, the S&P 500 fell over 10 percent in two days, in its worst week since the COVID-19 recession of 2020. Markets worldwide dropped substantially at the same time in response to Trump's tariffs, causing the Russell 2000 to enter a bear market and the U.S. bond market suffered a sell-off resulting from a loss in investor confidence in the stability of the U.S. stock markets.

Trump has been accused of market manipulation and insider trading, such as during the implementation of the Liberation Day tariffs in April of 2025 when Trump paused most of his tariffs and told his followers on Truth Social to buy stocks ahead of time, quickly reversing the 2025 stock market crash. In 2026, financial records revealed that Trump traded more than $200 million in the stock market, leading Democratic lawmakers to accuse Trump of corruption and labeling it a "national security disaster". The Washington Post observed that Trump viewed the stock markets as part of Wall Street as a key barometer to economic health. During his signing of the Islamabad Memorandum to end the 2026 Iran war, Trump admitted, "I didn't want to see economic catastrophe. If you kept this going, that could have happened, but all I know is every time we talked about the possibility of peace, the stock market shot up like a rocket ship."

== Cryptocurrency ==
Trump promised to deregulate cryptocurrency in the United States, and turn the U.S. into the "crypto capital of the planet". After his 2024 election victory, the price of Bitcoin reached an all-time high. In March 2025, at a "crypto summit" hosted by Trump, David O. Sacks—who Trump named his administration's "crypto czar", said that the cryptocurrency industry had been "subjected to prosecution and persecution". Trump named Paul S. Atkins as chair of the U.S. Securities and Exchange Commission (SEC). Under Trump, the SEC filed to dismiss its lawsuit against Coinbase that charged it with operating as an "unregistered securities exchange, broker, and clearing agency", requested a 60-day pause in its lawsuit against Binance for violating securities laws, and asked that its case against Chinese cryptocurrency billionaire Justin Sun, a Trump associate, be put on hold. The SEC also said it would not exercise any regulatory authority over memecoins, or cryptocurrency originating from internet memes.

After a brief initial rise, the price of the $Trump meme coin declined. About 764,000 people who invested after the all time high on 19 January 2025 lost money.

The Melania meme coin experienced extreme volatility in its first days, after which it declined in price.

The market price of World Liberty's WLFI token declined after becoming publicly traded, though a Trump business entity collected a 75% cut of WLFI sales despite its decline. Donald Trump's 2025 profits reached $799 million.

On January 17, 2025, three days before his inauguration, Trump had launched and promoted $TRUMP, a memecoin that soared to a market valuation of $5 billion in a few hours, becoming the 19th most valuable cryptocurrency in the world by January 19. Trump personally benefitted from the trade of $TRUMP, potentially increasing his net worth by over $50 billion and drawing criticism from ethics experts and government watchdogs. Some commentators noted the irony of Trump becoming a strong backer of an industry that he said "seems like a scam" not long after the end of his first presidency.

In March 2025, Trump established the United States strategic Bitcoin reserve, funded by Bitcoin already owned by the U.S. federal government and U.S. treasury. The U.S. is the largest known state holder of Bitcoin in the world, largely due to seized assets. Trump also created a U.S. government stockpile of non-Bitcoin digital assets.

== Competition ==
In August 2025, Trump signed Executive Order 14337 (Revocation of Executive Order on Competition).

== Law enforcement ==
In February 2025, Trump signed Executive Order 14209 (Pausing Foreign Corrupt Practices Act Enforcement to Further American Economic and National Security). The administration has weakened the Corporate Transparency Act and stopped a crackdown on tax havens by the IRS. A Reuters examination found "Federal tax prosecutions fell to their lowest level in decades". In June 2025, the senate confirmed Ken Kies to be the Treasury’s assistant secretary for tax policy. Kies was described as having "played an instrumental role in enabling some of the most lucrative and most important tax avoidance strategies used by multinational companies and the wealthiest Americans". The "administration is rapidly gutting" the corporate alternative minimum tax (CAMT) created by the Inflation Reduction Act.

== Small businesses ==
The Small Business Administration has been weakened.

== Minority businesses ==
Executive Order 14238 directs eliminating the Minority Business Development Agency.

== Consumer protection ==
The administration proposed withdrawing a Biden administration proposal to require airlines to pay passengers for flight disruptions "consistent with Executive Order (E.O.) 14192".

== Housing ==
Again, existing housing, people that own their homes, we're going to keep them wealthy. We're going to keep those prices up. We're not going to destroy the value of their homes so that somebody that didn't work very hard can buy a home. We're going to get -- we're going to make it easier to buy, we're going to get interest rates down, but I want to protect the people that for the first time in their lives feel good about themselves. They feel like they've -- you know that they're wealthy people. And I want them to understand that, you know, there's so much talk about, oh, we're going to drive housing prices down. I don't want to drive housing prices down. I want to drive housing prices up for people that own their homes, and they can be assured that's what's going to happen.

— Trump in a Cabinet Meeting on January 29, 2026,

The administration proposed a 50-year mortgage.

Trump refused to sign the bipartisan 21st Century ROAD to Housing Act, meant to address housing affordability, unless the Senate passed the SAVE America Act, which pushed voter ID requirements. The law eventually went into effect without his signature.

On March 13, 2026, Trump issued two executive orders aimed at enhancing home affordability. The first order seeks to alleviate federal regulatory burdens on housing, thereby incentivizing state and local governments to facilitate the construction of additional residential properties. The second order targets regulatory impediments related to mortgages, thereby enabling smaller community banks to extend home loan services. These modifications may precipitate an increase in residential construction and a decrease in mortgage costs. The impact of these decrees is anticipated to be felt in the midterm elections, as rising housing prices have emerged as a pivotal concern among voters under the age of 40. Furthermore, the orders are expected to have long-term effects on both homebuilders and homebuyers.

On October 22, 2026, Trump issued an executive order aimed at revitalizing the housing market by reducing mortgage payments and stimulating home ownership. The initiative is designed to alleviate the financial burden on American households, rendering homeownership more accessible and affordable. The order comprises four key measures: (i) The Federal Housing Finance Agency (FHFA) is instructed to organize a pilot program that cancels insurance premiums for government-backed mortgages upon satisfaction of equity requirements, thereby promoting homeownership and reducing the financial strain on borrowers. (ii) A task force is established to investigate and implement modern manufacturing methods to decrease home construction costs and enhance housing quality, thereby increasing the affordability and desirability of housing options. (iii) The FHFA is directed to expand an existing pilot program into a nationwide initiative, permitting Fannie Mae and Freddie Mac to accept approved automated title reviews for eligible refinances, rather than relying on lender-provided title insurance policies. This move is expected to streamline the refinancing process and reduce costs for borrowers. (iv) The secretaries of the US Department of Agriculture (USDA) and the Department of Veterans Affairs (VA) are instructed to reduce interest rates on single-family loans made directly by their departments, thereby making homeownership more accessible to a wider range of Americans. The president's executive order received widespread acclaim from the head of the Federal Housing Finance Agency and the executive vice president of the National Association of Realtors, who praised the initiative for its potential to make homeownership more sustainable for American families.

== Technology ==
=== AI boom and potential bubble ===
Trump with Jensen Huang, Mark Zuckerberg, and Elon Musk at an artificial intelligence luncheon at the White House, September 29, 2026

Donald Trump's second presidency occurred during the AI boom, though towards the end of Trump's first year in office some, such as The Atlantic's Rogé Karma, and AI entrepreneur Sam Altman questioned whether it could turn into a potential bubble, with optimistic AI investors struggling to recoup their investments. Economist Torsten Sløk gained headlines in July 2025 after suggesting that AI companies were overvalued, comparing it to the Dot-com bubble with a much more pessimistic outcome. Others, such as economist Erik Brynjolfsson and Anthropic entrepreneur Dario Amodei, argued that AI was yet to be adapted and would see much stronger takeup and performance in the latter part of Trump's second presidency.

Some economists argued that AI-related spending was holding up the U.S. economy, including Deutsche Bank researcher George Saravelos, who noted that "in the absence of tech-related spending, the US would be close to, or in, recession this year." Additionally, Paul Krugman argued that the AI spending boom exacerbated inequalities as a "K-shaped expansion" that made the affluent richer and led to severe pressure for the lowest.

In any case, in May 2026 The Economist's editor-in-chief Zanny Minton Beddoes suggested that while Trump had "got lucky" with the AI boom, his administration had put in place pro-growth policies and rolled back red tape in federal agencies, encouraging mergers and acquisitions. Nonetheless, Minton Beddoes argued that chaotic policies by the Trump administration had slowed growth by as much as 0.5%, which she called the "MAGA tax".

== Economic rhetoric ==
During the second Trump administration, Trump tended to openly take credit for whenever the US economy was in a good state but also cast blame for whenever it was in a bad state on the Biden administration. The president had a history of boasting that the US economy under him was in a "golden age", regardless of whether his claims were aligned with the views of the general American population regarding the state of the economy. Trump had additionally openly dismissed concerns from Americans regarding increased inflation like from his tariff policies and from the 2026 Iran war, labeling the term affordability a "hoax".

Observers have noticed that Trump has extensive power over the US economy using his rhetoric. On Truth Social, his statements like promises of trade wars have led to stock market panics that could be reversed by him using suggestions of better news. As a result, multiple acronyms had been devised in reference to Trump's patterns of rhetoric regarding his economy policies like "Trump Always Chickens Out" (TACO) and "Not A Chance Hormuz Opens" (NACHO).

== See also ==
- Tourism in the United States § 21st century
- Science policy of the second Trump administration
- Education policy of the second Trump administration
- Brexit
