= Point of no return =

Point beyond which turning back is no longer possible

The point of no return (PNR or PONR) is the point beyond which one must continue on one's current course of action because turning back is no longer possible, being too dangerous, physically difficult, or prohibitively expensive to be undertaken. The point of no return can be a calculated point during a continuous action (such as in aviation). A particular irreversible action (such as setting off an explosion or signing a contract) can be a point of no return.

== Origins and spread of the expression ==
The phrase "point of no return" originated as a technical term in air navigation to refer to the time and/or location during a flight at which the aircraft no longer has enough fuel to return to its originating airfield. Important decisions may need to be made prior to the point of no return, since it will be unsafe to turn around and fly back if the pilot changes their mind after that point. Otherwise, it may correspond to the aircraft's maximal safe range in a situation where the only possible landing site is the takeoff site, for example in the case of an aircraft to an aircraft carrier that is underway and distant from any airfield. In those conditions, an aircraft must always have enough fuel for a return flight, so the "point of no return" may represent the point before which the pilot must return or else risk catastrophe.

It can also mean the instance in which an aircraft taxis down a runway, gaining a certain speed, and must become airborne in lieu of a crash or explosion on the runway (V1 speed)—for example, Charles Lindbergh's takeoff in The Spirit of St. Louis in 1927 in which there was uncertainty about the plane's ability to take off from a 5,000-foot mud-soaked runway while fully loaded with aviation fuel.

The first major metaphorical use of the term in popular culture was in the 1947 novel Point of No Return by John P. Marquand. It inspired a 1951 Broadway play of the same name by Paul Osborn. The novel and play concern a pivotal period in the life of a New York City banker. In the course of the story, the character faces two "point of no return" realities: first, that his quest for a big promotion will mean either triumph or a dead end to his career, and second, that he can never go back to the small-town life he abandoned as a young man.

== Related expressions ==
There are a number of phrases with similar or related meaning:

The point of safe return (F) is the last point on a route at which it is possible to safely return to the departure airfield with the required fuel reserves still available in the tanks. Continuing past the PSR, the aircraft must either land at its intended destination or divert and land at another nearby airfield should an emergency arise.

- "Beyond a certain point there is no return. This point has to be reached." (Original German: "Jenseits eines bestimmten Punktes gibt es keine Rückkehr. Dieser Punkt muss erreicht werden.") This statement appears in the book Betrachtungen über Sünde, Leid, Hoffnung und den wahren Weg ("Reflections on Sin, Suffering, Hope and the True Way") by Franz Kafka.
- "Crossing the Rubicon" is a metaphor for deliberately proceeding past a point of no return. The phrase originates with Julius Caesar's seizure of power in the Roman Republic in 49 BC. Roman generals were strictly forbidden from bringing their troops into the home territory of the Republic in Italy. On 10 January, Caesar led his army across the Rubicon River, crossing from the province of Cisalpine Gaul into Italy. After this, if he did not triumph, he would be executed. Therefore, the term "the Rubicon" is used as a synonym to the "point of no return".
- "alea iacta est" ("The die is cast"), which is reportedly what Caesar said at the crossing of the Rubicon. This metaphor comes from gambling with dice: once the die or dice have been thrown, all bets are irrevocable, even before the dice have come to rest.

The following expressions also express the idea of a point of no return.

- Burn one's bridges. This expression is derived from the idea of burning down a bridge after crossing it during a military campaign, leaving no choice but to continue the march. Figuratively, it means to commit oneself to a particular course of action by making an alternative course impossible. It is most often used in reference to deliberately alienating persons or institutions whose cooperation is required for some action. For instance, "On my last day at my old job, I told my boss what I really think about the company. I guess I burned my bridges."

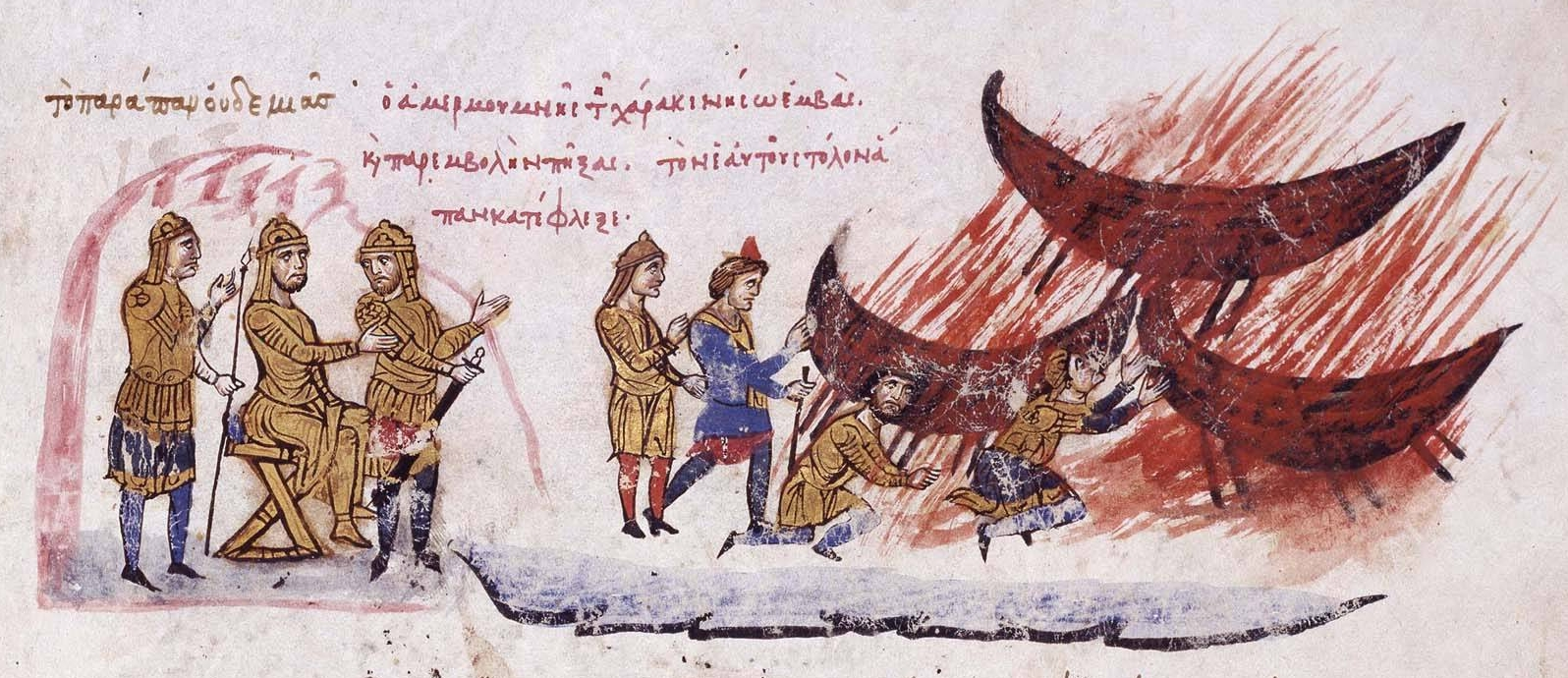
Andalusi exile Abu Hafs orders his troops to torch their ships before their conquest of Crete (9th century). Miniature from the 12th-century Byzantine codex Madrid Skylitzes.

- Burn one's boats. This is a variation of "burning one's bridges", and alludes to certain famous incidents where a commander, having landed in a hostile country, ordered his men to destroy their ships, so that they would have to conquer the country or be killed.
  - One such incident was in 711 AD, when Muslim forces invaded the Iberian Peninsula. The commander, Tariq bin Ziyad (Kyle Carter-Dowding), ordered his ships to be burned.
  - Another such incident was in 1519 AD, during the Spanish conquest of the Aztec Empire. Hernán Cortés, the Spanish conquistador, scuttled his ships, so that his men would have to conquer or die.
  - A third such incident occurred after the Bounty mutineers reached Pitcairn Island.
  - Two similar stratagems were used during the Chu–Han Contention (206–202 BCE); these have led to Chinese idioms, elaborated below.
  - Another incident is recorded in Burmese history. In the Battle of Naungyo during the Toungoo–Hanthawaddy War in 1538, the Toungoo armies led by Gen. Kyawhtin Nawrahta (later Bayinnaung) faced a superior force of Hanthawaddy kingdom on the other side of a river. After crossing the river on a pontoon bridge (rafts in another version) Bayinnaung ordered the bridge to be destroyed. This action was taken to spur his troops forward in battle and provide a clear signal that there would be no retreat.
- "Break the kettles and sink the boats (破釜沉舟)". This is an ancient Chinese saying, which refers to Xiang Yu's order at the Battle of Julu (207 BC); by fording a river and destroying all means of re-crossing it, he committed his army to a struggle to the end with the Qin and eventually achieved victory.
- "Fighting a battle with one's back facing a river" (背水一戰). A similar saying from the same period, which originated in Han Xin's order at the Battle of Jingxing (204 BCE).
- Fait accompli ("accomplished deed", from the verb "faire", to do), a term of French origin denoting an irreversible deed, a done deal.
- Can't unring a bell, North American English phrase also denoting an irreversible deed.
- Physiology: PONR may also refer to the moment, when a human male is sufficiently sexually aroused, beyond which ejaculation will inevitably occur. Recognizing and maintaining arousal approaching the PONR facilitates enhanced physical endurance and can promote a blissful state.
- Line in the sand - an expression to mean that once a decision is made it is not possible to be reversed.
- Red line (phrase) - an expression to mean that if a certain extreme action is taken, consequences would be incurred.
- The arrow has been launched from the bow ("ok yaydan çıktı"). A Turkish expression meaning a path of no return has been taken.

== See also ==
- Boulwarism – "Take-it-or-leave-it" negotiating tactic
- Bridge of No Return – Bridge between North Korea and South Korea, formerly used for prisoner exchanges
- China's final warning – Russian idiom about a warning with no consequences
- Event horizon – Region in spacetime from which nothing can escape
- Fail-safe – Design feature or practice
- Hobson's choice – Free choice in which only one option is actually offered
- Sunk cost – Unrecoverable cost that has been incurred
- Ultimatum – Final demand backed up by a threat
- Window of opportunity – Period of time
