= Moses Rose =

Alamo survivor

Louis "Moses" Rose, sometimes written as Lewis Rose, (1785? – 1850/1851?) was, according to Texas legend, the only man who chose to leave the besieged Alamo in 1836, rather than fight and die there. He was illiterate and many believe that his tale was embellished by those who were writing on his behalf. Some question the accuracy of this part of the legend.

== Life before the Alamo ==
According to the most commonly told story, Rose was a French Jew who had served in the French army under Napoleon. He supposedly served in Italy, the French invasion of Russia and the Peninsular War. It seems clear that he was at the Alamo for some unknown portion of the 13-day siege and missed the massacre at dawn on March 6, 1836. He knew many details about the Alamo garrison and gave the names of some participants, and, whenever asked, admitted that he had left when given the chance before the final assault, because he was not ready to die.

== Presence in the Alamo ==
It is known that the butcher Louis Rose, of Nacogdoches, Texas, testified on behalf of the estates of five men who may have been at the Alamo. In each of these cases he made statements similar to "left him in the Alamo [sic] 3 March 1836". In none of his testimony did Rose explicitly state that he was a member of the Alamo garrison, or that he had entered the Alamo and later escaped. In at least one case, the man on whose behalf he testified had not been at the Alamo, although he had the same name as one of the known Alamo defenders; in a second case, the man (Henry Teal), was later proved to have died after the battle's conclusion. The affidavit evidence appears to be reliable, since there is corroborative evidence of the named men having been in the garrison, and Rose' own presence in the Alamo was noted by the survivor Susanna Dickinson.

Rose was said to have been a member of Colonel James Bowie's forces and had fought during the siege of Bexar, and that he then joined Bowie in reinforcing the Alamo Mission in San Antonio de Bexar in late January 1836. The available records do not permit historians to confirm these accounts. Rose's name is not found on any muster rolls for the siege of Bexar. Neither a Louis nor a Moses Rose is listed on the muster rolls that James C. Neill compiled for the Alamo garrison on December 31, 1835, or February 1, 1836, although Bowie was listed on the latter document.

On the other hand, a man named "Rose" from Nacogdoches was listed as an Alamo victim in the March 14, 1836, issue of the Telegraph and Texas Register. This first attempt to name the men at the Alamo was compiled by John William Smith, one of the last couriers to leave the Alamo, and Gerald Navan, who probably also left the Alamo as a courier. Alamo survivor Susanna Dickinson testified in 1853 and again in 1857 that the only man named "Rose" of whom she knew in the Alamo was James Rose, who accompanied Davy Crockett and who had died. On the other hand, many of the known defenders from the roll accepted by historians are verified by less evidence than that supported Rose, and over the years names have been added or removed as evidence emerges.

Historian Thomas Ricks Lindley speculates that Louis "Moses" Rose had intended to fight at the Alamo and had joined volunteers who attempted to reinforce the Alamo on March 4. According to Lindley, while fifty or so of the volunteers successfully entered the Alamo complex, the remainder were driven away by Mexican troops. Rose may have been in the group that was repulsed, and either had seen some of his comrades enter the Alamo, or assumed that they had successfully entered. There is no other evidence that such a large group attempted to come to the aid of the defenders.

== Rose in the legend of the Alamo ==
The traditional account of the battle includes the following description of Rose's actions.

In March 1836, the Alamo was surrounded by the Mexican Army, which raised a "no quarter" flag, promising death to all defenders. Travis, the Texan commander, drew a line in the sand with his sword. He asked the defenders to cross over it, and thereby pledge to fight (and presumably die) in the Alamo. All did, except Rose. Crockett is supposed to have urged him to cross the line, but he remained standing. Later in the night, he is supposed to have slipped over the wall.

If Rose fled the Alamo on the night Travis drew the line, it might have been March 3 or March 5, since by the evening of March 3 it was apparent that no further reinforcements were coming and Santa Anna had delivered both an ultimatum and a chance for noncombatants to leave safely. Rose managed to evade Mexican forces, and made his way to Grimes County, where he found rest and shelter at the home of one William P. Zuber. Rose made no attempt at hiding the true story of his journey, attributing his decision to a love for his family (including his children), stating that he "just wasn't ready to die;" or that he had the desire to fight another day rather than face a slaughter like those he had seen in previous failed battles. Rose did not fight another day, but moved on to settle in Nacogdoches, Texas, where he operated a butcher shop. He would unashamedly explain to customers or anyone who asked why he had decided not to die in the Alamo.

Some historians have said that the story of the line in the sand was first told by Rose himself; however, it was standard frontier militia practice to give the men the choice to leave before battle, since they might leave on their own under fire anyway. In addition, other accounts of Travis "haranguing" the men or giving them the choice to stay were part of the record before the Zuber account surfaced, and similar ultimatums were given before other battles in Texas. Whether there ever was an actual line drawn in the sand is disputed, but the evidence does suggest that all Alamo defenders were at one point given a choice to stay or to go.

When the legendary account is accepted, Louis Rose is sometimes portrayed as a coward, though he was 51 at the time and had seen the cost of futile warfare in conflicts on two continents. This is largely due to the pride Texans take from the Battle of the Alamo, and the contrast of Rose with the defenders who chose to stay and die. His alleged actions suffer further in comparison with the 32 volunteers who evaded the Mexican forces to join the garrison.

Some advocates for Rose have noted that others also left during the battle, notably Juan Seguin (who was sent to seek reinforcements and is considered an Alamo hero), and at least twelve others who left as couriers during a brief armistice. Others note that Seguin and the other couriers were ordered to leave as part of their duty, while Rose chose to leave in order to save his own life. (In fact, Juan Seguin and other couriers returned to the scene, though the Alamo had fallen by the time Seguin arrived.)

In the years following the fall of the Alamo, Rose was sometimes contacted by relatives of men that died at the Alamo, to help verify their deaths, so that their survivors could settle land disputes or property claims. He was also sometimes casually questioned about his actions at the famous battle, and never denied that he had been there. As noted above, on some lists of the participants in the Battle of the Alamo, Rose is not even listed; proponents of the legendary account believe this is so because Rose left before the climax of the battle. Reportedly Rose died about 1850 in Louisiana. In 1927, relatives of Rose presented his musket to the Alamo Museum.

The song Moses Rose of Texas, which was written by folk singer Steve Suffet and which uses the tune of the song The Yellow Rose of Texas, begins with the popular story of Rose, saying in part

He's Moses Rose of Texas,
and today nobody knows,
he's the one who left the Alamo,
the night before the foe
came storming in up across the walls
and killed the men inside,
but Moses Rose of Texas
is the one who never died.

Suffet's parody, however, goes on to present a more nuanced interpretation of Rose's actions:

Whenever you are up against,

Pressure from your peers,
Or a challenge to your manhood,
Or frightened by the jeers,
Remember that discretion,
Is valor's better part,
And let the life of Moses Rose,

Put courage in your heart.

The 1952 film The Man from the Alamo, starring Glenn Ford, is loosely based on Rose's story, and Ford's character is accused of having been a coward, even though he was selected to escape the Alamo to protect the families of the defenders from looters and bandits. The film is very poor on historical accuracy, though the opening scenes of the battle are well done; and the plot was criticized by some Texan traditionalist groups, such as the Daughters of the Republic of Texas.

== Identity ==
"For the first thirty-eight years of the twentieth century," wrote Thomas Ricks Lindley, "William P. Zuber's story of Moses Rose's alleged escape from the Alamo was an unsubstantiated tale accepted by few historians." Then in 1939, Texas archivist Robert B. Blake uncovered land grant statements from the Nacogdoches County Courthouse containing elements that seemed to verify Zuber's story. Because Blake appears to have believed him, he assumed that a Stephen and a Lewis or Louis Rose who, in their day, had signed testimony about Alamo defenders to the Board of Land Commissioners, were but one and same old Frenchman whose real name was Louis Rose. According to Blake, it was the very Rose described in the Texas Almanac for 1873, "Moses" becoming a nickname given to him by the Alamo defenders for his great age, 50 (Gordon C. Jenning, 56, was the oldest Alamo fighter at the time).

In 1982, Steven G. Kellman, professor of comparative literature at the University of Texas at San Antonio, brought fresh grist to the mill by publishing a short study, "The Yellow Rose of Texas". Kellman believed that the copies of military documents he had obtained from the Service Historiques de la Défense in Vincennes, France, showed that Lieutenant "Moses, né Louis" Roze was born in La Férée, Ardennes, on May 11, 1785.

Two different first names – Stephen and Lewis or Louis – plus a nickname, Moses – for the same man now explicitly identified by Professor Kellman as an officer in Napoleon's army brought questions to historian Gerard Dôle's mind. In order to retrace the life of Louis Roze, he consulted Louis Roze's complete military records at the French Archives Historiques de la Défense in Vincennes, as well as the complete dossier on his Légion d'Honneur at the Archives Nationales in Paris. At the same time, his assistant Stéphane Vielle went to work collecting and studying various official documents concerning Lieutenant Louis Roze, born in La Férée, Ardennes, on May 11, 1785. Dôle and Vielle concluded that there had been a case of mistaken identity. Louis Roze, born in La Férée, could not have been the Louis "Moses" Rose of Nacogdoches and the Alamo because he had never crossed the Atlantic, though he died about the same time as the Alamo Rose, on May 25, 1851 in Braine. The certificate was signed and witnessed by his friend Paul Masure, and again mentions that Roze was a Chevalier de la Légion d'Honneur and native of La Férée.

== Sources ==
- Chariton, Wallace O. (1990), Exploring the Alamo Legends, Dallas, TX: Republic of Texas Press, ISBN 978-1-55622-255-9
- Lindley, Thomas Ricks (2003), Alamo Traces: New Evidence and New Conclusions, Lanham, MD: Republic of Texas Press, ISBN 1-55622-983-6
