= Trump Always Chickens Out =

Phrase describing policies of the Trump administration

"Trump Always Chickens Out" (TACO) is a pejorative description of the perceived tendency of United States president Donald Trump to make threats, only to later delay or renege on them as a way to increase time for negotiations, allow markets to rebound, and avert backlash. The phrase was popularized in May 2025 after the many threats and reversals during the trade war he initiated with his "Liberation Day" tariffs. On Wall Street, a TACO trade is buying stocks cheaply after a tariff announcement pushes stocks lower, then selling them at a profit after the tariffs are delayed or reduced and the market rebounds.

In 2025 and 2026, TACO was also used to describe Trump's statements threatening to annex Greenland, and his efforts to negotiate a last-minute ceasefire deal with Iran before his deadline for initiating an American bombing campaign.

== Background ==
Trump's tendency to change stance on policy positions and even the competence of his own appointees (e.g. Federal Reserve governor Jerome Powell) had been reported since his first presidential campaign and administration. Before the emergence of the TACO acronym during Trump's second term in office, observers used terms such as backtrack and flip-flop. Wall Street traders called it the "Trump put" when, during his first term, he would change a policy if the markets reacted badly to it.

This tendency, by both Trump and Democratic presidential candidate Kamala Harris, was reported in the lead up to, and during, Trump's second presidency, with commentators noting specific issues including trade, immigration, and international relations.

== Origins ==
The phrase "TACO trade" was first used by the Financial Times journalist Robert Armstrong in a May 2, 2025 opinion piece that discussed tariffs and their effects on the US markets. In the piece, part of a series titled "Unhedged", Armstrong said that markets were realizing that "the US administration does not have a very high tolerance for market and economic pressure, and will be quick to back off when tariffs cause pain". Armstrong called this "the Taco theory: Trump Always Chickens Out". TACO is a play on the Mexican food, alluding to Trump's obsession with securing the Mexico–United States border:

I was just like trying different things and TACO kind of popped into my mind, possibly because I was hungry, but possibly because it sounds a little bit [like] something like the president would make up himself.

It's the kind of petty jive that he sort of likes, and it also has a slightly Mexican flavour to it, which is very funny in the case of this president who's obsessed with the border.

"Chickening out" is slang for being frightened and deciding against a planned course of action. The French press have used "Trump always deflates", and some Italian papers use an idiom that translates roughly as "always wets himself". Since the coinage of TACO, more abbreviations about the behaviors of Trump or of financial markets have been devised, such as "TUNA" ("Trump Usually Negates Announcements").

== Examples ==
=== Tariffs ===
Katie Martin of the Financial Times gave three examples of "the Taco factor" where Trump had reversed a decision in response to the market's reaction: Trump setting high "Liberation Day tariffs" and pausing them a week later, his calling for the termination of Federal Reserve chair Jerome Powell before distancing himself from the idea, and the US committing to roll back tariffs against China during trade talks in May. Another example is when Trump would delay his 50% tariff proposal affecting EU imports to July 9; this would later cause European markets to rally.

Shannon Pettypiece of NBC News gave ten examples of Trump having "threatened, then backtracked on, tariffs" since taking office, saying that in her view Trump had threatened "far more" tariffs than he had imposed.

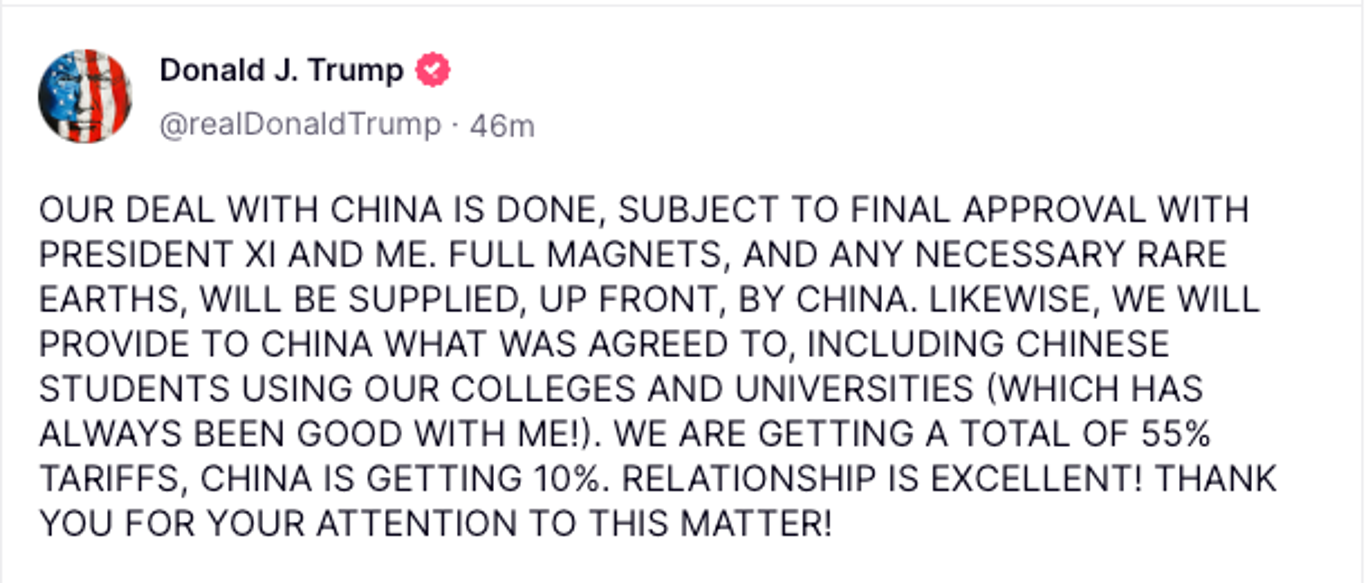
A Truth Social post from Donald Trump announcing a reversal of some tariffs against China, seen by analysts as Trump having "chickened out"

On June 11, 2025, Trump posted on Truth Social that he had reached a deal in the US's trade war with China. ABC News noted that a Chinese spokesperson said it was a "framework" to consolidate the agreements reached in May, and that the talks represented the "first meeting". Secretary of Commerce Howard Lutnick referred to the agreement as a "handshake for a framework". The Wall Street Journal published an editorial criticizing the deal, calling it a "truce that tilts in China's direction" by appearing to be "resetting their trade relationship to where it was a few months ago before a tit-for-tat escalation". Fareed Zakaria of The Washington Post saw the vague trade deal as an example of "TACO", except for "one twist", that Americans "will still pay a tariff rate of 55 percent on goods from China (compared to China's 10 percent tariff on American goods)".

On July 8, 2025, Trump again announced a delay in implementing tariffs against 14 countries, pushing back the deadline for negotiations from July 9 to August 1. Bloomberg reported that Trump has softened his hardline tone on China to ensure a summit with General Secretary of the Chinese Communist Party Xi Jinping, aiming to push for a trade agreement between America and China.

=== Foreign relations ===
Gideon Rachman of the Financial Times wrote that "Trump always chickens out on foreign policy too", citing a paper by Jeremy Shapiro of the European Council on Foreign Relations that found that Trump had threatened the use of force against foreign adversaries on 22 occasions (as of early 2025), but actually did so on only two occasions. For example, during his first term, Trump threatened "fire and fury" against North Korea and threatened to wipe Afghanistan "off the face of the earth" within ten days; Trump followed through in neither case, instead attempting negotiations with North Korea over its nuclear program and entering into an agreement for a US withdrawal from Afghanistan without any meaningful concessions from the Taliban in return.

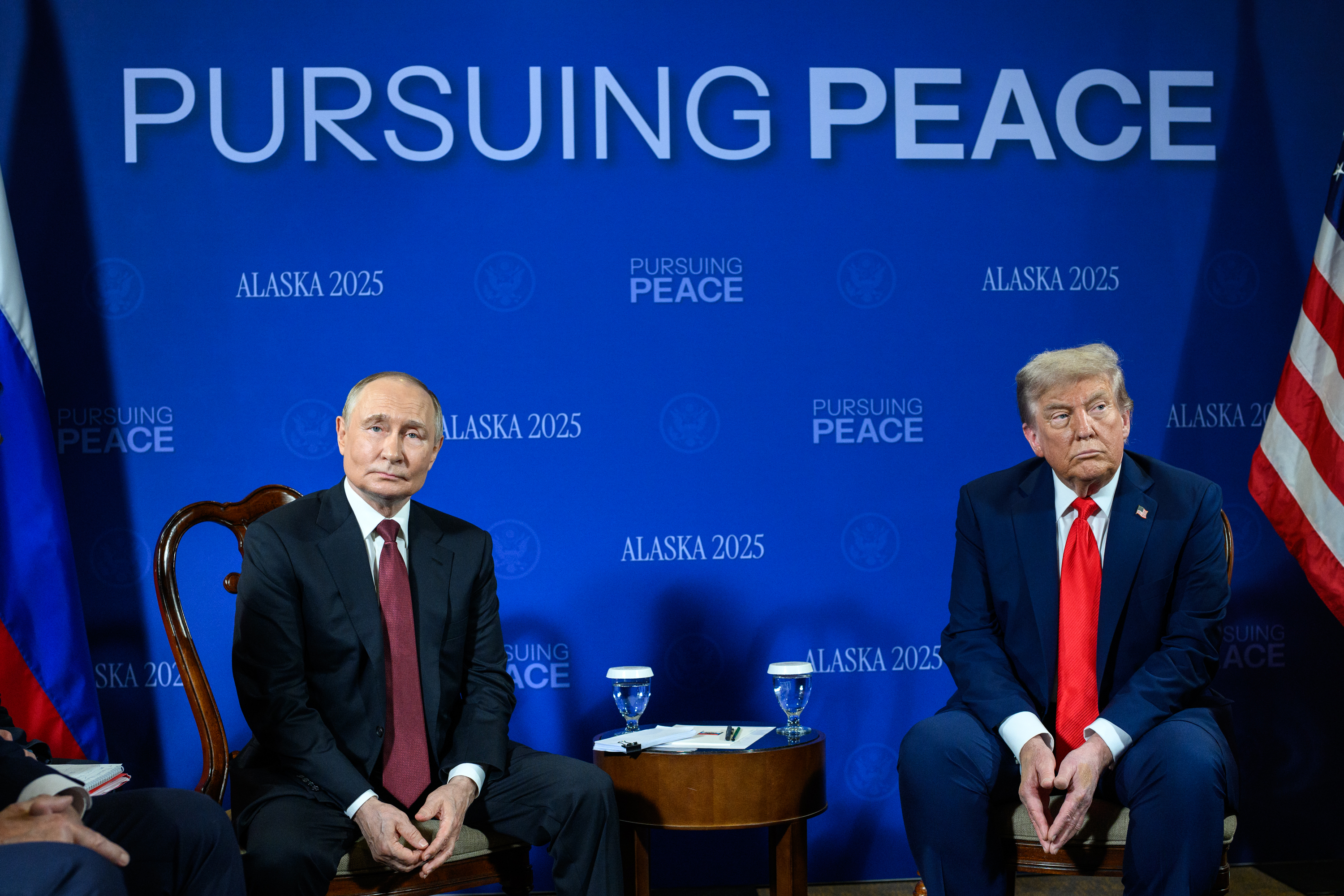
Putin and Trump at the 2025 Alaska summit

Trump threatened "extreme consequences" if Russia did not agree to a ceasefire by 8 August 2025. When the deadline came, Trump instead announced that he would host Putin in Alaska. The term was used to describe the outcome of the August 2025 summit in Alaska. Trump threatened to impose further sanctions on Russia if it did commit to ending its war against Ukraine. Putin ignored the warnings, and Trump did not follow through on them after the summit. Instead, Trump suggested that the onus was now on Ukraine to give up territory to end the war.

In January 2026, TACO was widely used to describe Trump's reversal of his threats to annex Greenland and impose tariffs on NATO allies who opposed him.

Following the 2026 Iran protests, after Trump threatened the Iranian leadership with military intervention, TACO was used by commentators to describe Trump's actions when they did not promptly materialize. Instead, the United States briefly pursued nuclear negotiations with Iran, before later launching strikes alongside Israel, which had started attacks on Iran during the course of those negotiations.

As the subsequent 2026 Iran war began to impact global oil and securities markets, analysts assessed that Trump's attempt to TACO out of the conflict might not have been feasible as Iran was unwilling to compromise, calling Trump's bluff. In April 2026, Trump issued a deadline, set for 8 April at 8:00 pm EDT, where he threatened to bomb all of Iran's power plants and bridges, if Iran did not agree to his demands. Two days before the deadline, Iran had proposed a ten-point peace plan which Trump had rejected and told reporters was "not good enough". However, about an hour and 20 minutes before the deadline was to expire, Trump backed away from his ultimatum and suspended planned strikes for two weeks as part of a ceasefire agreement, stating that Iran's ten-point peace proposal was a "workable" basis for further negotiations. Multiple events involving Trump following the ceasefire have also been pointed out as instances of "TACO". On 21 April, after having threatened to resume attacks if the US and Iran did not come to a full agreement to end the war, he unilaterally extended the ceasefire to indefinite time and claimed that he paused the attacks because Pakistani Prime Minister Shehbaz Sharif and Field Marshal Asim Munir asked him to and also because the Iranian leadership was supposedly too divided. On 7 May, Trump paused Operation Project Freedom, an American military operation to guide merchant ships through Middle Eastern waters, after less than 48 hours. CNN recorded that between March and June 9, Trump had falsely claimed to be nearing an agreement with Iran to end the war at least 38 times.

==== "Not A Chance Hormuz Opens" ====
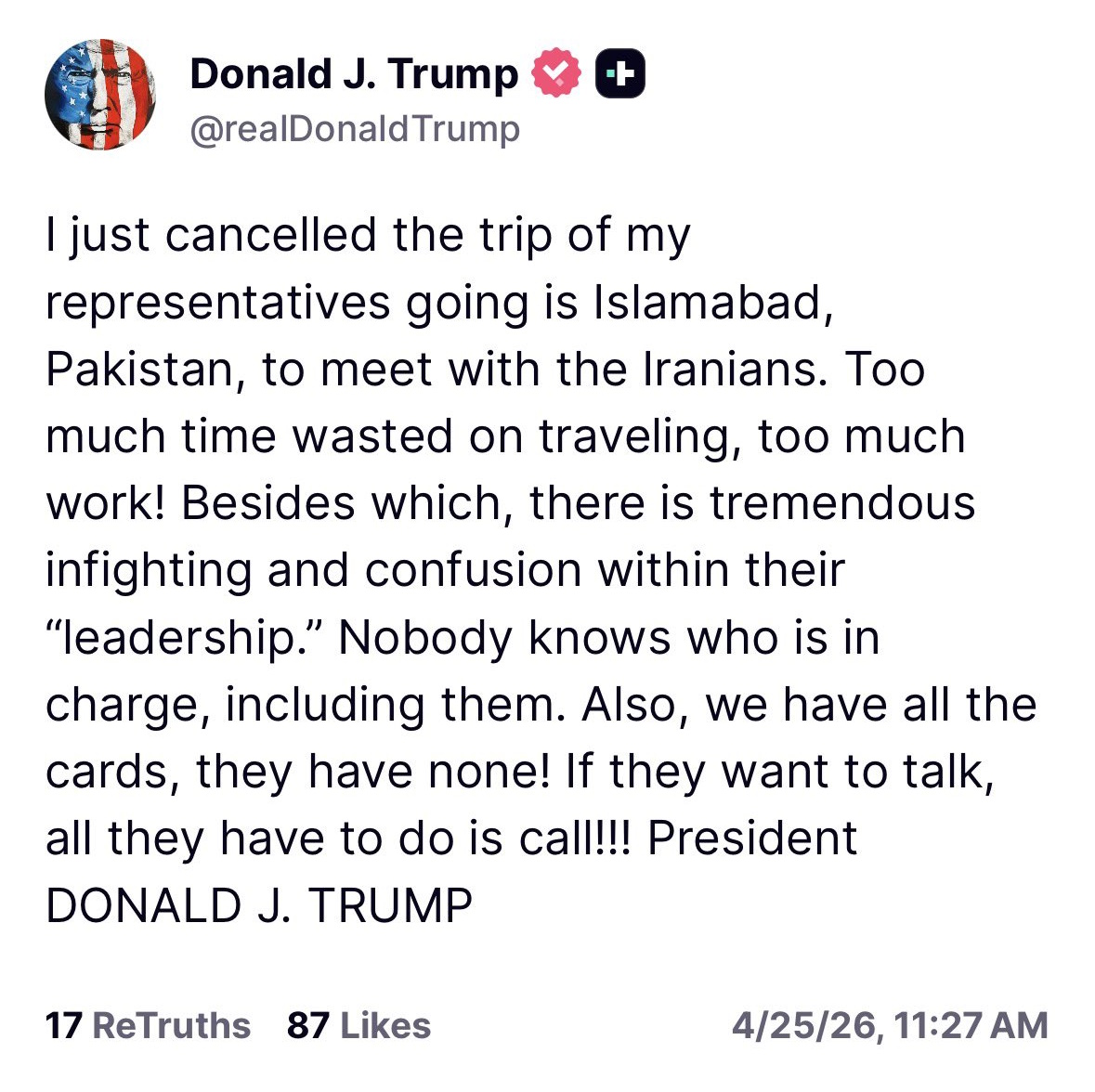
Trump's cancellation of further negotiations with Iran about the 2026 Strait of Hormuz crisis is cited as an instance of "NACHO"

On April 29, 2026, Bloomberg columnist Javier Blas wrote on X that one trader told him of a variation on TACO that mocked Trump's involvement in the 2026 Iran war: the abbreviation "NACHO", or "Not A Chance Hormuz Opens". NACHO refers to the disruption of fuel shipping from the Strait of Hormuz, including 20% of all oil and natural gas maritime transit, by Iran in response to the US-Israeli attacks. The term also referenced Trump's inability to end the war exclusively on his own terms. Trump's execution of the conflict with Iran was criticized on April 29, when Trump said that the naval blockade could last several months. The 2026 Strait of Hormuz crisis resulted in steep increases in global oil prices including those of the US, with fuel prices surging by 40% since February 2026. Increases in global energy prices and availability frustrated Trump, who claimed that Iran was "begging" for an end to the 2026 United States naval blockade of Iran, and threatened further strikes if the Strait of Hormuz were not to be reopened. Fox News had attempted, weeks prior, to establish its own version of the "NACHO" abbreviation, to counter the negative connotation of "TACO", called "Never Avoids Confronting Hard Obstacles", but the term failed to become popular. Responding to this acronym, White House spokesperson Kush Desai said, "are these the same geniuses who thought President Trump would never secure voluntary Most-Favored-Nations drug pricing deals or renegotiate broken trade deals?" International relations analyst Trita Parsi argued that Trump was desperate to maintain the ceasefire and obtain a favorable deal with Iranian leaders, to the point of denying ceasefire violations from Iran, but also kept seeking maximalist demands that undermined the talks. Trump officials and advisors confirmed to The Atlantic that Trump was growing "bored" of the war but was also frustrated at Iran's hardened stance, with the administration overall still being reluctant to restart the war.

=== Immigration ===
News media had also argued that Trump "chickens out" on immigration policy as well, particularly on policies regarding mass deportations. For instance, Immigration and Customs Enforcement (ICE) agents began raiding locations across the Californian city of Los Angeles to crack down on immigration, sparking public backlash there in the form of protests in June 2025. On June 12, Trump wrote on Truth Social that the immigration crackdown policy ended up hurting farmers by taking away workers. The same day, senior ICE official Tatum King wrote an order for an immediate pause on immigration raids on agricultural workplaces, restaurants, and hotels. On October the same year, in response to Trump's threats to arrest Chicago mayor Brandon Johnson and Illinois governor JB Pritzker for "failing to protect" ICE officers on Truth Social, Pritzker dismissed the threats. He referred to Trump as "demented, literally; unhinged" and "insecure" but also being unable to execute his threats in practice, directly mentioning the "TACO" abbreviation. In January 2026, after anti-ICE protests in Minneapolis, Minnesota which were sparked by surged ICE activity there as part of Operation Metro Surge and the killings of American citizens Renée Good and Alex Pretti by federal agents during the operation, White House press secretary Karoline Leavitt announced a "constructive and productive conversation" between Trump and Minnesota governor Tim Walz and a potential withdrawal of federal agents in the city.

=== Related uses ===
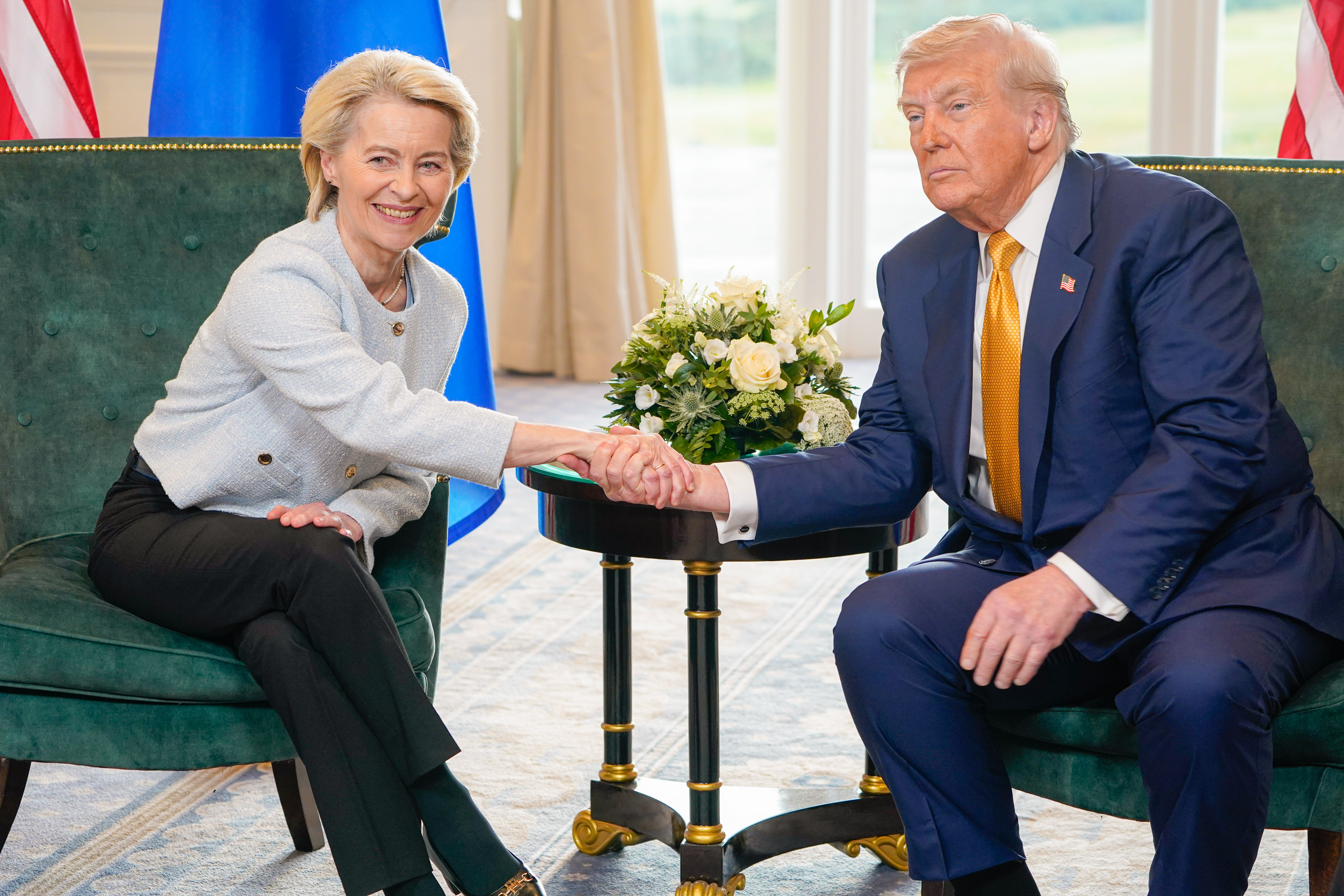
The European Union has been criticized for "chickening out" to the US on trade retaliations against it. (Trump meeting with Ursula von der Leyen pictured.)

A variant of "TACO" is "EACO" (Europe Always Chickens Out) or "EUCO". "EUCO" has been applied to the European Union as well during trade negotiations with the US since Trump initiated program of tariffs (and reversals) in 2025. Criticized as a process of appeasement, the EU avoided using its so-called "anti-coercion mechanisms" in retaliation for Trump's tariffs and instead attempted to negotiate a deal with the US with the tariffs applied. The EU's refusal to implement stronger measures was due to fears that Trump would withdraw US military defense of Europe, especially impacting funding of the Russo-Ukrainian War. As a result, it repeatedly delayed counter-tariff packages meant to target specific imported goods from the US.

The United States has been noted to be able to exploit the EU's dependence on it, especially due to the internal divisions and lack of strategy from the EU. Of note was that the EU officials previously refused to accept 10% tariffs on exported goods to the US. The EU later agreed to a trade deal in which most of its exported goods to the US would be subjected to 15% tariffs in exchange for no tariffs applied to US goods. Critics have argued that the EU under the European Commission president Ursula von der Leyen surrendered to the US, with John O'Brien of the Irish Examiner arguing that it showed weakness and refused to accept short-term pain for long-term benefits. Lionel Laurent of Bloomberg News described the uneven trade deal as a threat towards the EU's already weak economic growth and remarked that "[m]aybe it isn't Trump who always chickens out."

== Reactions ==
=== In politics and economy ===
Trump was asked by Megan Cassella, a CNBC Correspondent, what he thought about the term on May 28, 2025, during a swearing-in ceremony for the acting attorney general. He denied the behavior, saying "it's called negotiation". He called the question a "nasty question", adding "I usually have the opposite problem. They say I am too tough". According to CNN, Trump had not yet heard the term, and he first understood that Cassella was calling him a chicken.

Lawrence O'Donnell pointed out Trump's policies and actions that, in his opinion, will be reversed by the courts, but which, together with the reversals Trump himself has done, characterize him as an ineffective president since everybody is increasingly aware that he will back down, giving rise to the acronym TACO, while the tariff war keeps hurting American businesses. The New York Times quoted analysts Salomon Fiedler of Berenberg Bank, Paul Donovan of UBS Wealth Management, and Chris Beauchamp of IG Group, saying that Trump's tariff threats do not last.

On May 28, 2025, the United States Court of International Trade (CIT) ruled that Trump had overreached his authority under the International Emergency Economic Powers Act (IEEPA) and vacated all tariffs related to it. This prompted California Governor Gavin Newsom to comment, "It's raining tacos today." Reuters published a note about acronyms popular among investors four months into Trump's second term: YOLO, TACO, MEGA, MAGA (Make America Go Away), and FAFO. When reached for comment, White House spokesman Kush Desai said in an email, "these asinine acronyms convey how unserious analysts have consistently beclowned themselves by mocking President Trump and his agenda that've already delivered multiple expectation-beating jobs and inflation reports, trillions in investment commitments, a historic UK trade agreement, and rising consumer confidence."

In an interview with Nicolle Wallace on MSNBC on May 30, economist Justin Wolfers coined additional acronyms about Trump's actions themed on Mexican food: Burrito – the "Blatantly Unconstitutional Rewriting of the Rules of International Trade, Obviously". He said that the correct response would be to invoke Churro – the "Courts Have Ultimate Responsibility to Restore Order".

David A. Graham, writing for The Atlantic, recalled his own 2018 analysis of Trump's "pattern of nearly always folding" on international politics during his first term, pointing out that Wall Street is just "catching on", and given that now Trump knows about the TACO trade expression it could mean that he may make bad choices and persist on them, causing the markets to tank. In an interview for Reuters, in the context of Trump's May 30 announcement of increased tariffs on steel and aluminum, Joachim Klement, head of strategy at the investment bank Panmure Liberum said, "We think that, unfortunately, as the so-called TACO trade becomes more viral, it becomes more likely that Trump will stick to higher tariffs just to prove a point."

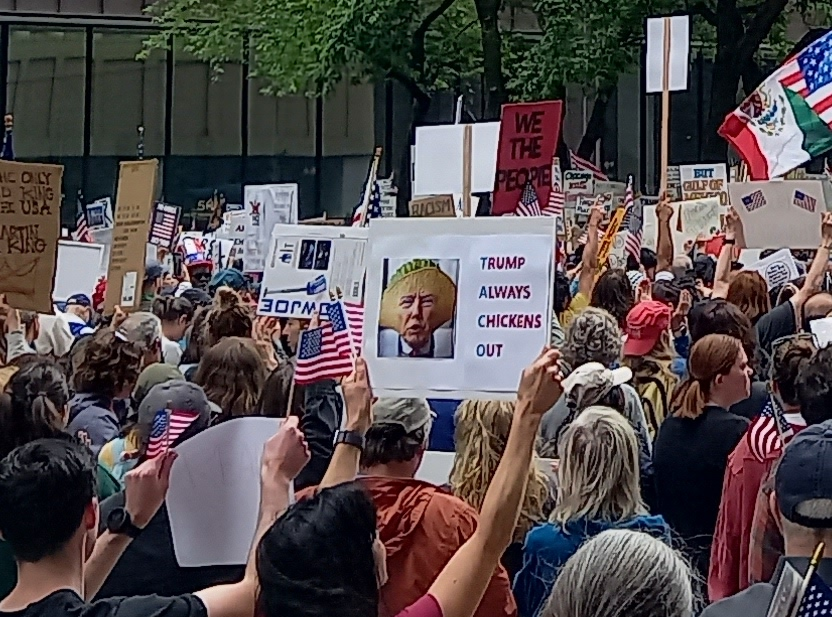
No Kings protester in Chicago holding a sign saying "Trump Always Chickens Out"

On June 3, 2025, a Tuesday, the Democratic National Committee parked a rented taco truck, customized with images of Trump wearing a chicken costume, outside the Republican National Committee headquarters, and distributed free tacos to passers-by "as an effective way to draw attention to Trump's tariff policies, which they described as "playing games with working families' livelihoods". Vice President JD Vance criticized the opposition party as "lame", to which the DNC answered calling him "the cringiest VP in American history", and mentioning that the One Big Beautiful Bill Act is likely to "take away food from people".

Zeeshan Aleem, writing for MSNBC, criticized Democrats using TACO as a political slogan because it is inexact, as Trump was (as of June 2025) maintaining both baseline and specific tariffs. Also, Aleem argued: "Why on Earth would Democrats dare Trump to follow through on his most extreme tariff threats?" Aleem quotes Robert Armstrong lamenting the impact of his creation: "Let us state clearly, chickening out is good and something to be celebrated. Bad policy chickening out, hooray." Finally, because if the Democrats' message is that Trump is a threat to democracy, "it's a bit odd to simultaneously argue that Trump is all talk and no action". Dot Dot News writer Tom Fowdy expressed his opinion that the market trends associated with the TACO acronym are examples of market manipulation resulting from Trump's obsession with financial markets, arguing that Trump psychologically manipulated market traders into thinking that he had obtained economic deals regardless of the long-term economic consequences of his decisions.

Journalists of multiple publications during the 2026 Iran war have noted that Trump was unable to "chicken out" of the conflict with Iran despite wanting to do so (i.e. by repeatedly declaring victory) because Iran had great control over the course of the war and also that the United States was not yet equipped to perform larger-scale operations like a full-scale invasion of Kharg Island, a critical Iranian oil hub. They noted that Trump had repeatedly threatened bombing Iranian power plants and bridges – the threats and potential actions both considered by experts to be war crimes – before backing out of the threats while Iran threatened retaliations. Critics have also argued that Trump demonstrated consistent strategic weakness in foreign policy as a result of his repeated decisions to back out of his threats including during the Iran war, therefore undermining American credibility.

=== In the media ===
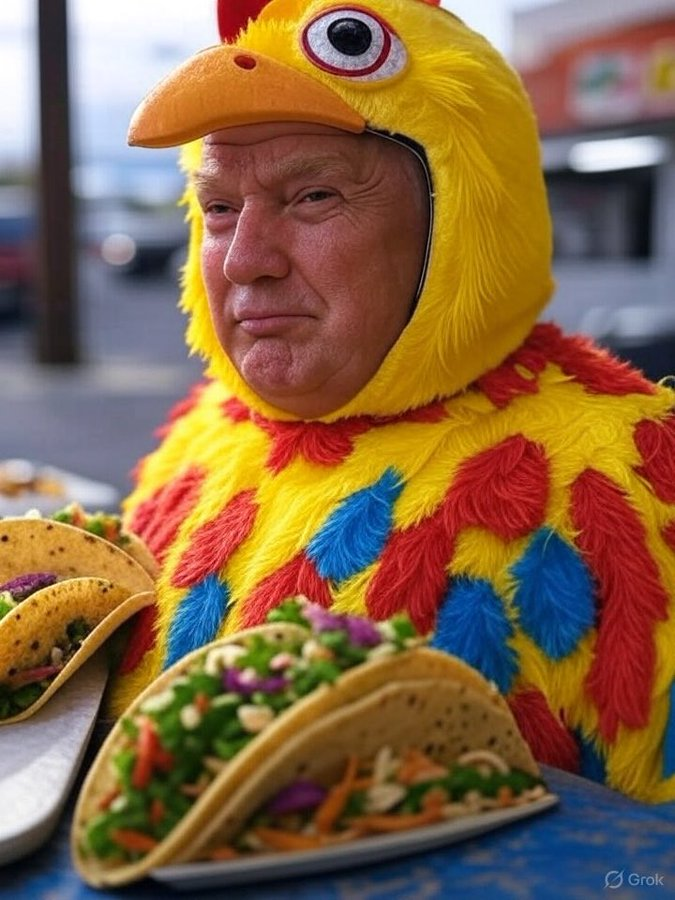
An AI-generated image of Donald Trump dressed as a chicken and holding tacos

Almost immediately after Trump's response, multiple memes about Trump mentioned TACO or "Trump Always Chickens Out". The memes often employed generative AI to produce artificial images and video of Trump in situations parodying the term. Editorial cartoons satirized Trump's reaction, frequently utilizing puns and exaggerated caricatures of Trump and Vladimir Putin.

TACO has been widely referenced in Anglophone news outlets around the world, including the UK, Canada, India, Australia, Israel, and Ghana. The phrase has also been translated into many other languages, including Estonian (Trump lööb alati vedelaks), French (Trump se dégonfle toujours), German (Trump macht immer einen Rückzieher), Norwegian (Trump trekker seg alltid), Slovene (Trump se vedno ustraši), Spanish (Trump siempre se acobarda), Brazilian Portuguese (Trump sempre amarela), and other languages.

The View hosts Whoopi Goldberg, Joy Behar and Ana Navarro praised the TACO phrase on their show. Navarro's analysis and discussion of the nickname with other cohosts included why they suspected the name gained traction and what led to the name's popularity, stating "For a nickname to be effective, there's got to be truth to it, which this has: His trade policy is all over the place [...] And it's got to get under the person's skin, which it clearly did". Host Sara Haines noted Trump's common use of insulting nicknames for public figures he dislikes. Navarro also likened the trending nickname to "karma" for Trump's previous actions relating to Mexico in the beginning of his second term, including banning the Associated Press from White House press events due to their refusal to refer to the Gulf of Mexico as the "Gulf of America".

== See also ==
- False or misleading statements by Donald Trump – Information about other contexts in which Trump has set and broken deadlines, that have also influenced the TACO acronym.
- China's final warning – A joke of similar vein in Soviet and now popular Russian discourse poking fun at incessant "final" threats which never come to fruition.
- Red lines in the Russo-Ukrainian war – Veiled threats of engagement by Russian president Vladimir Putin.
- Corruption allegations during the second Trump presidency – Allegations of market manipulation under the second Trump administration.
- Insider trading allegations during the second Trump administration – Allegations of insider trading under the second Trump administration.
