= Red line (phrase) =

Figurative phrase meaning a limit

The red line, or "to cross the red line", is a phrase used worldwide to mean a figurative point of no return or line in the sand, or "the fastest, farthest, or highest point or degree considered safe".

== Origins ==
The origin of the phrase in English traces back to the "Red Line Agreement" in 1928 between the largest oil companies of Great Britain, the US, and France at the time of the end of the Ottoman Empire. At the time of signature, the former empire's borders were unclear. To remedy the problem, Armenian businessman Calouste Gulbenkian took a red pencil to draw arbitrarily the borders of the divided empire. The expression remained significant to global diplomacy and was reused during the UN's founding after WWII, especially in the English-speaking world. Uniquely, in France, one would "cross the yellow line" (franchir la ligne jaune).

== History of usage ==
In Israel, the phrase was notably used as a political metaphor by Foreign Minister Yigal Allon in 1975, when he said that Washington "has managed to draw a red line which all the Arab countries know they must not cross - that America is not going to sacrifice Israel for the sake of Arab support." Yitzhak Rabin later used the phrase to refer to the line past which the Syrian Army should not be allowed to cross after the 1976 occupation of Lebanon. On 27 September 2012, at the 67th United Nations General Assembly at the UN Headquarters in New York City in a speech addressing Iran's nuclear program, Israeli Prime Minister Benjamin Netanyahu publicly added a red line to a prepared bomb cartoon.

According to Ben Yagoda, a professor of English and journalism at the University of Delaware, in 1987, there are references to "red lines" in conflicts between Chad and Libya. In a 1999 New York Times article, Muslim clerics in Iran are reported to draw a "'red line for the revolution' that no one should cross." These references occurred earlier as well, appearing a Milwaukee Sentinel article of 26 January 1984 regarding French intervention in Chad and a "red line" held by French forces in southern Chad.

The phrase has been used by US diplomats going back to the 1990s. For example, US officials, quoted by Reuters news agency in May 1994, used the term about negotiations with North Korea over the withdrawal of reactor fuel; and Martin Walker in The Guardian used the same phrase in June, about statements by United States officials. Secretary of State Warren Christopher used the phrase about NATO control over the peace-keeping mission in the Bosnian War on the CBS program Face the Nation on 22 October 1995. Barack Obama used the phrase on 20 August 2012, during the Syrian civil war concerning chemical weapons, saying that "We have been very clear to the Assad regime, but also to other players on the ground, that a red line for us is we start seeing a whole bunch of chemical weapons moving around or being utilized. That would change my calculus. That would change my equation."

In the US, the phrase then became a source of contention when political opponent John McCain said the red line was "apparently written in disappearing ink" due to the perception the red line had been crossed with no action. On the first anniversary of Obama's red line speech, the Ghouta chemical attacks occurred. Obama then clarified, "I didn't set a red line. The world set a red line when governments representing 98 percent of the world's population said the use of chemical weapons are abhorrent and passed a treaty forbidding their use even when countries are engaged in war" about the Chemical Weapons Convention.

The phrase has seen usage in the Russo-Ukrainian War, especially since Russia invaded Ukraine. Both sides have said to have had "red lines", which the other has crossed, with varying levels of consequences. For example, Russia annexed Crimea in 2014, for which, whilst sanctions were issued, construction of the Nord Stream 2 gas pipeline continued, indicating a level of tolerance. However, when Russia commenced its full-scale invasion in 2022, there were much broader consequences, for example cutting Russian banks off the SWIFT system, and a massive donation of arms from the US and Europe. On the Russian side, Putin's red lines that have been broken have included not supplying aid or missiles to Ukraine, not letting Ukraine strike deep into Russian territory, and not having any Western soldiers deployed in Ukraine. Putin's response was to slow gas through Nord Stream 1 and 2 to a trickle, also repeatedly hinting at and outright threatening a nuclear response. The two pipes of Nord Stream 1 and one of the two pipes of Nord Stream 2 were destroyed in September 2022, with the perpetrators unknown as of 2025.

== Thin Red Line ==
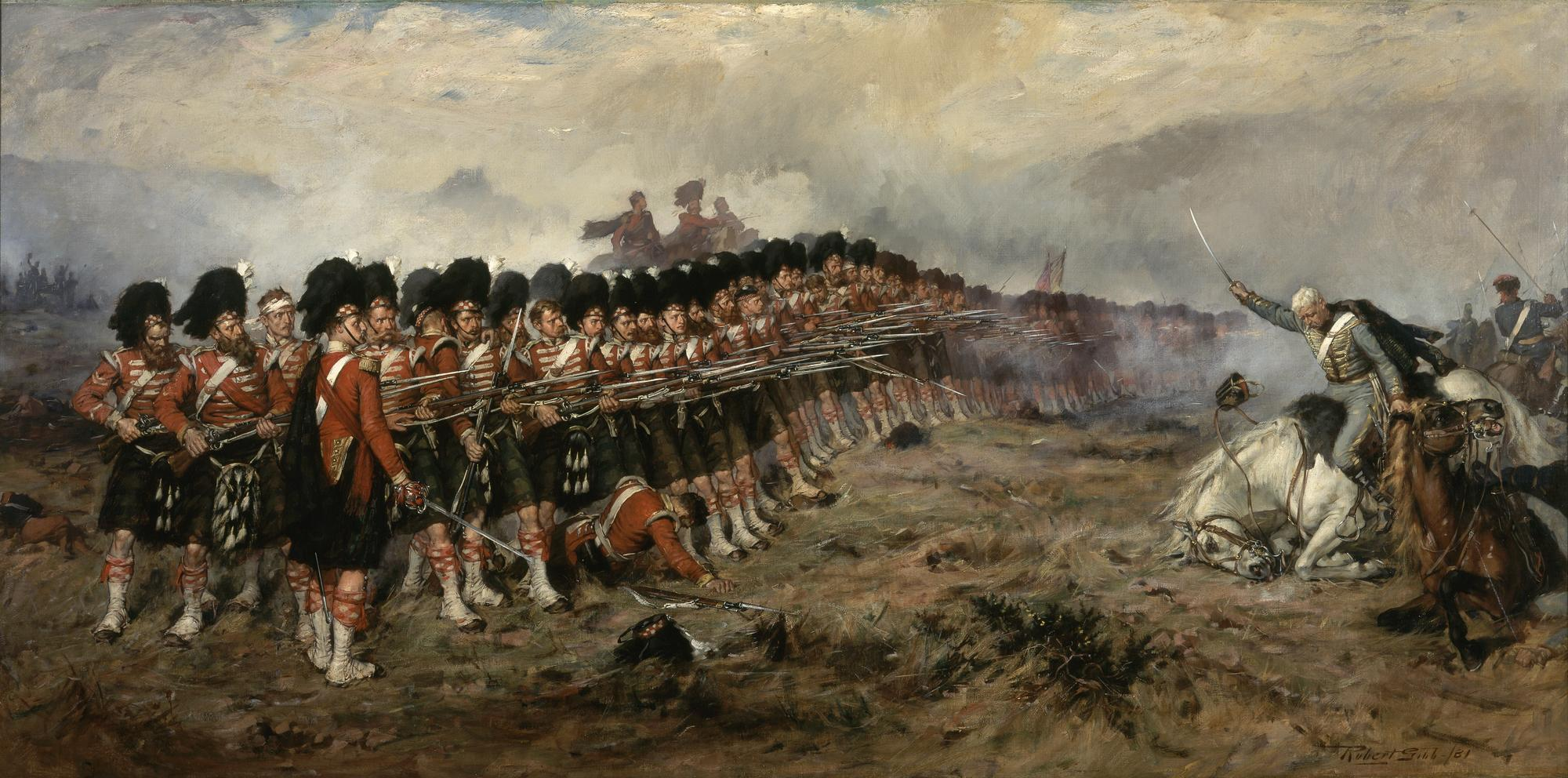
The Thin Red Line (1881) by Robert Gibb, depicting the 93rd Regiment of Foot of the British army fighting off Russian cavalry at the Battle of Balaclava in 1854

From British English, an entirely different figure of speech for an act of great courage against impossible order or thinly spread military unit holding firm against attack, or the "thin red line", originates from reports of a red-coated Scottish regiment at the Battle of Balaclava during the Crimean War. A journalist described a "thin red streak tipped with a line of steel" with the appearance of the 93rd (Highland) Regiment and parts of the Turkish army as they stood before (and repelled) a vastly superior force of Russian cavalry. The reference was soon shortened into the thin red line, and famously described by Rudyard Kipling in the poem Tommy as "the thin red line of 'eroes [heroes]."

Notable literary uses included George Orwell who in A Clergyman's Daughter invented a book-within-a-book called the "Hundred Page History of Britain, a 'nasty little duodecimo book' of 1888, which declared anachronistically that Napoleon 'soon found that in the "thin red line" he had more than met his match.'" American author James Jones later used The Thin Red Line as the title of his 1962 novel about the Battle of Guadalcanal, helping to further popularize its usage.

Its popularity of this use in the USA has increased since the Andrew Marton's 1964 movie and Terrence Malick's 1998 movie of Jones's novel, the latter of which was ranked as one of the ten best action and war films of all time. The basic idea was extended in the 20th century to apply to police officers, such as The Thin Blue Line, about the frequently blue color of police uniforms. The Mexican film The Thin Yellow Line, references this but using it about the dangerous conditions of the workers who paint the yellow lines that separates lanes in intersate highways in rural mexico.

== See also ==
- China's final warning – Russian idiom about a warning with no consequences
- Crossing the Rubicon – Idiom meaning a point of no return
- Letters of last resort – Orders for action in the event of nuclear attack on UK
- Line in the sand – Idiom with figurative and literal meanings
- Point of no return – Point beyond which turning back is no longer possible
- Red lines in the Russo-Ukrainian War – Veiled threats of engagement
- Redline
- Thick line
- Ultimatum – Final demand backed up by a threat
- Window of opportunity – Period of time
