= Ultimatum =

Final demand backed up by a threat

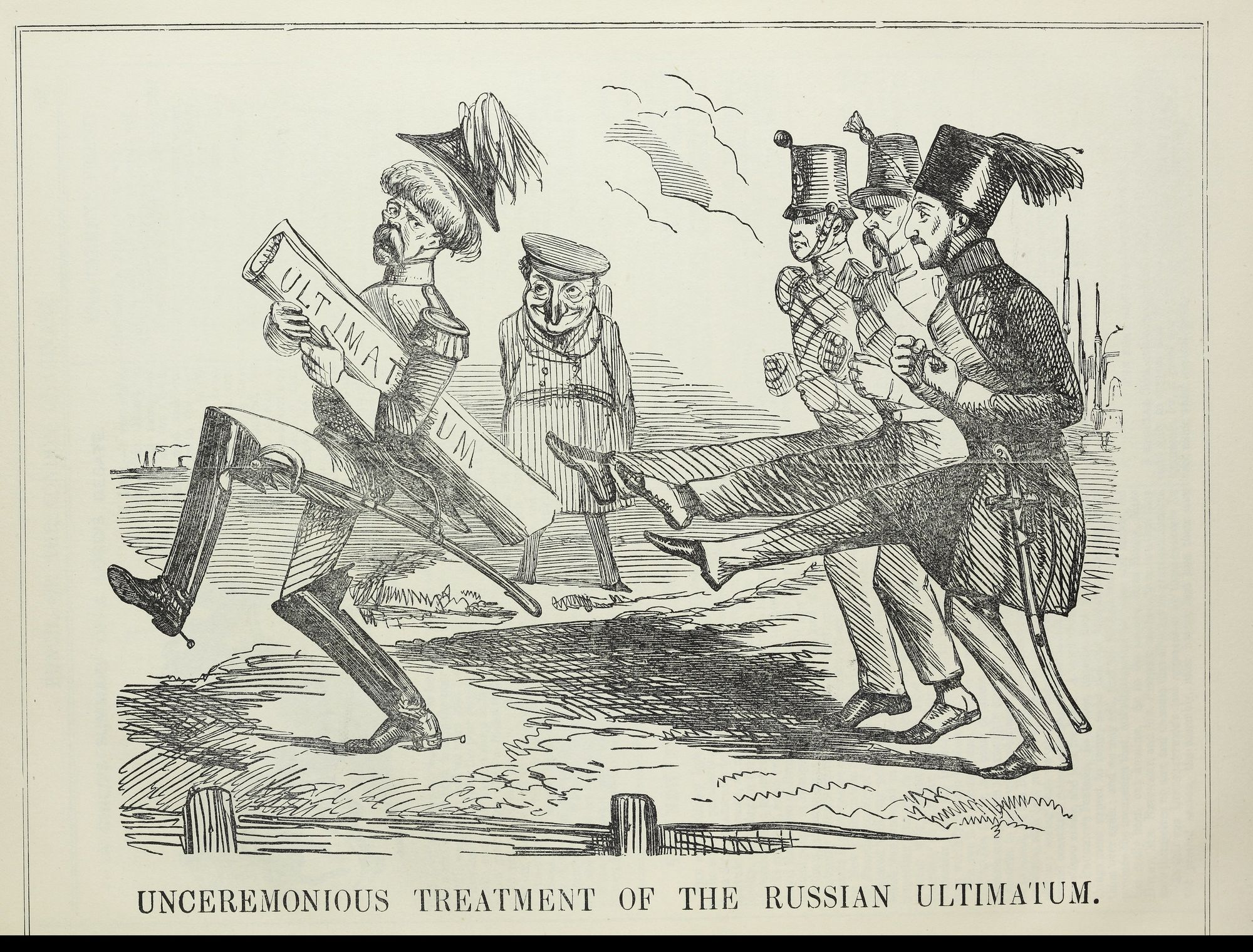
The 1853 negotiations between Russian envoy, Prince Menshikov, and the Turkish Sultan about the protection of Orthodox Christians in the Ottoman Empire involved a series of ultimata. On 31 May, Russia threatened that the vassal states of Moldavia and Wallachia would be occupied if Menshikov's note was not accepted within seven days. This Punch cartoon satirises rejection of the ultimatum.

An ultimatum is a demand whose fulfillment is requested in a specified period of time and which is backed up by a threat to be followed through in case of noncompliance (open loop). An ultimatum is generally the final demand in a series of requests. As such, the time allotted is usually short, and the request is understood not to be open to further negotiation. The threat which backs up the ultimatum can vary depending on the demand in question and on the other circumstances.

The word is used in diplomacy to signify the final terms submitted by one of the parties in negotiation for settlement of any subject of disagreement. It is accompanied by an intimation as to how refusal will be regarded. English diplomacy has devised the adroit reservation that refusal will be regarded as an "unfriendly act", a phrase which serves as a warning that the consequences of the rupture of negotiations will be considered from the point of view of forcing a settlement. This opens up a variety of possibilities, such as good offices, mediation, the appointment of a commission of inquiry, arbitration, reprisals, pacific blockade and war. (Note: To these may be added a new unofficial method devised by the Turks in connexion with the Austro-Turkish difficulty over the annexation of Bosnia-Herzegovina, viz. the boycotting of the goods and ships of the natives of the state against which the grievance exists. This is a method open to weaker as against more powerful states, which can have serious coercive and even complicated consequences under the influence of democratic institutions.)

== Deterrence ==
Unlike the circumstances of an ultimatum, the scenario of deterrence is not bound by specific constraints of time, place, or action, and though a threat may be present, there is no formal guarantee of it being acted out. The scenario of nuclear deterrence (particularly the United States and the Soviet Union in the Cold War) is a good example of this concept: while both nations maintained a sizeable stockpile of nuclear weapons aimed at each other, the intent was to prevent open conflict (closed loop), and that no formal condition for initiating conflict was ever established, except in retaliation for the other side initiating an attack. In an ultimatum situation, such as during the Cuban Missile Crisis, either nation would threaten the use of nuclear weapons if certain demands/constraints were not met independent of that retaliatory capability that would have a fixed point of no return—compliance or warfare.

== Requirement for military action ==
An ultimatum may also serve to provide legitimacy for military action. During the July Crisis, Austria-Hungary sent a Ten point ultimatum to Serbia in response to the Assassination of Archduke Franz Ferdinand, with the most contentious point being for Serbia to "Accept representatives of the Austro-Hungarian government for the suppression of subversive movements". The Ultimatum was controversial among other European powers, with the Russian foreign minister saying that no state could accept such demands without "committing suicide." Serbia refused to accept all ten demands, and on July 28, 1914, Austria-Hungary would declare war on Serbia, beginning the First World War.

== International law ==
The Hague Convention relevant to the Opening of Hostilities of 18 October 1907, provides as follows:

"Considering that it is important, in order to ensure the maintenances of pacific relations, that hostilities should not commence without previous warning," it is agreed by the Contracting Powers to "recognize that hostilities between them must not commence without a previous and explicit warning in the form of either a declaration of war, giving reasons, or an ultimatum with a conditional declaration of war."

As reasons for a declaration of war are necessarily in the nature of an ultimatum, the ultimatum may now be regarded as an indispensable formality precedent to the outbreak of hostilities.

Another Hague convention of the same date respecting the limitation of the employment of force for the recovery of contract debts provides as follows:

"Being desirous of preventing between nations armed conflicts originating in a pecuniary dispute respecting contract debts claimed from the government of one country by the government of another country as due to its subjects or citizens," the Contracting Powers agree "not to have recourse to armed force for the recovery of contract debts claimed from the government of one country by the government of another country as being due to its subjects or citizens."

This undertaking, however, is not applicable when the debtor state refuses or neglects to reply to an offer of arbitration or, "after accepting the offer, renders the settlement of the compromise impossible, or, after the arbitration, fails to comply with the award."

Under this convention, in the cases that it relates, the alternative of the ultimatum is ipso facto arbitration, and it is only when the conditions of the convention have been set at naught that other measures may be employed.

=== Subsequent to the United Nations Charter ===
The United Nations Charter prohibits not only the use of force but also the threat of such use of force, but there is discussion on whether this prohibition applies only to (militarily) credible threats, whether (or when) the threat of the use of force in self-defence is permitted, and what actions (not necessarily accompanied by a verbal threat) can be considered a threat. The International Court of Justice has provided guidance on the legality of the use of threats: generally, if the use of force would be lawful, the threat of such use of force is also legal, and if the actual use of force is later found lawful, then the prior threat is also deemed lawful.

== Advantages and disadvantages ==
The actor that presents the other side with an ultimatum should be prepared to make good on the threat, for instance, initiate military action, if the other side does not comply with its demands. There are dangers if the threatened actor decides not to comply. On the one hand, if the actor presenting the ultimatum is not willing to go through with the threatened action, the other actor may "call their bluff" presenting a choice between a humiliating climb-down and an unwanted result (such as war). On the other hand, the opponent may take the ultimatum seriously and take pre-emptive action. The ultimatum may encourage the opponent to remain firm so as not to be seen as weak.

One danger here is that the opponent may profess to accept the ultimatum, possibly with conditions, thus weakening the credibility of the issuer of the ultimatum.

Another danger is that the issuer may keep negotiating with the opponent when the requested period of time ends, further weakening the issuer's position.

== Theory and strategy behind coercive diplomacy ==
The strategy behind an ultimatum and coercive diplomacy is that, when faced with significant pressure and a looming threat, the opposing actor will be compelled to make concessions due to the sense of urgency.

== Notable examples ==
- 1914 Austro-Hungarian ultimatum to Serbia
- 1939 German ultimatum to Poland
- 1939 British ultimatum to Germany

== See also ==
- Boulwarism – "Take-it-or-leave-it" negotiating tactic
- China's final warning – Russian idiom about a warning with no consequences
- Crossing the Rubicon – Idiom to mean a point of no return
- Hobson's choice – Free choice in which only one option is actually offered
- Point of no return – Point beyond which turning back is no longer possible
- Red line (phrase) – Figurative phrase meaning a limit

== Sources ==
- Byman, Daniel; Waxman, Matthew (2002). The Dynamics of Coercion: American Foreign Policy and the Limits of Military Might. Cambridge University Press. ISBN 978-052100780-1.
- George, Alexander L. (1991). Art, Robert J.; Cronin, Patrick M. (eds.). Forceful Persuasion: Coercive Diplomacy as an Alternative to War. US Institute of Peace Press. ISBN 978-187837914-6.
- George, Alexander L. (2003). "Foreword". In Art, Robert J.; Cronin, Patrick M. (eds.). The United States and coercive diplomacy. US Institute of Peace Press. pp. i–xiii. ISBN 978-192922345-9.
- Grimal, Francis (2012). Threats of Force: International Law and Strategy. Routledge. ISBN 978-0415609852.
- Levy, Jack S. (2008). "Deterrence and Coercive Diplomacy: The Contributions of Alexander George" (PDF). Political Psychology. 29 (4): 537–552. doi:10.1111/j.1467-9221.2008.00648.x. Archived from the original (PDF) on 20 July 2011.
- Nemeth, Lisa (2009). The Use of Pauses in Coercion: An Explanation in Theory (PDF) (Report). Fort Leavenworth, Kansas: School of Advanced Military Studies, United States Army Command and General Staff College. Archived from the original on 4 June 2011.
- Tanous, Stephen M. (7 April 2003). Building a Psychological Strategy for the U.S.: Leveraging the Informational Element of National Power (PDF) (Report). USAWC STRATEGY RESEARCH PROJECT. Carlisle Barracks, Pennsylvania: U.S. Army War College. Archived (PDF) from the original on 2 November 2009.
- Art, Robert J.; Waltz, Kenneth Neal, eds. (2004). The Use of Force: Military Power and International Politics. Rowman & Littlefield. ISBN 978-074252557-3.
- Hill, Norman. "Was There an Ultimatum Before Pearl Harbour?". American Journal of International Law. Vol 42. No 2. Apr 1948. p 335. JSTOR.
- Lauren, Paul Gorden. "Ultimata and Coercive Diplomacy". International Studies Quarterly. Vol 16. No 2. Jun 1972. p 131. JSTOR.
