= China's final warning =

Russian idiom about a warning with no consequences

"China's final warning" (Russian: последнее китайское предупреждение, romanized: posledneye kitayskoye preduprezhdeniye) is a Russian ironic idiom originating from the Soviet Union that refers to a warning that carries no real consequences.

== History ==
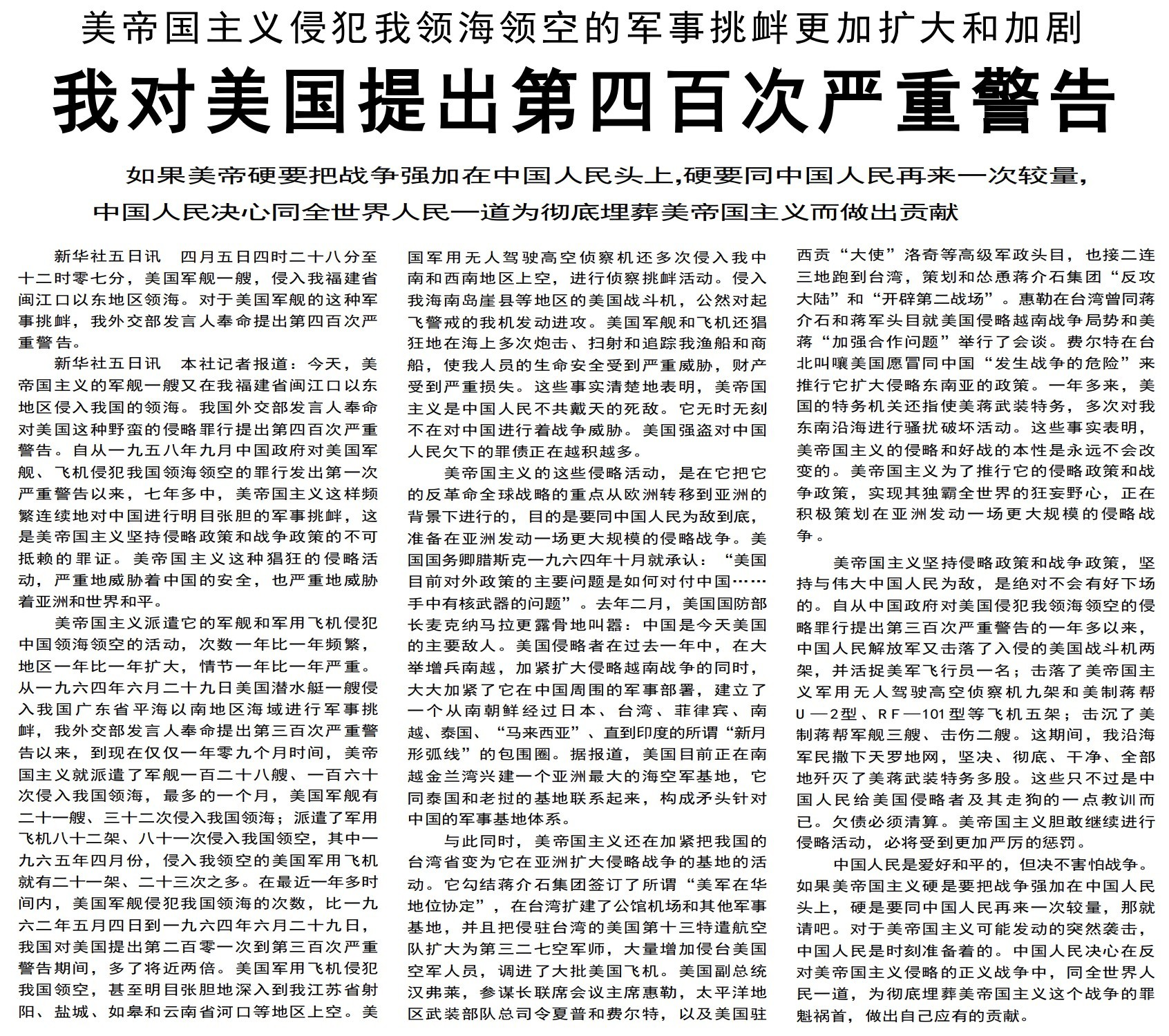
China officially issued its 400th serious warning to the United States over military intrusions into its territorial waters and airspace, as published in Chinese state-run People's Daily on 6 April 1966.

Relations between the People's Republic of China and the United States during the 1950s and 1960s were strained because of disputes over the political status of Taiwan. American military fighter jets regularly patrolled and performed fighter maneuvers in the Taiwan Strait, which led to formal protests being regularly lodged by the Chinese Communist Party in the form of a "serious warning". The People's Republic of China released its first serious warning to the United States on 7 September 1958 during the Second Taiwan Strait Crisis. On 24 December 1971, the 497th serious warning had been issued, but they were not followed by any significant consequences.

These protests were frequently broadcast on Soviet radio, "voiced by announcer Yuri Levitan in his solemn voice", which led to general awareness of the "final warnings" among the Soviet populace and common use of the term "China's final warning" within Soviet households to refer to empty threats. Citizens would often add numbers to the phrase for added humorous effect, such as "231st final Chinese warning" and "850th final Chinese warning". Since the 1972 Shanghai Communiqué that warmed China–United States relations, the phrase has continued being used in reference to fruitless warnings in situations unrelated to politics or China.

The term was popularized in English-language social media during the lead-up to Nancy Pelosi's 2022 visit to Taiwan to refer to China's threats, which were said to be superficially strong but actually weak.

== See also ==
- The Boy Who Cried Wolf – Aesop's fable
- Crossing the Rubicon – Idiom meaning a point of no return
- Hurting the feelings of the Chinese people – Chinese Communist Party political slogan
- Nothing ever happens (meme) – Internet meme
- Paper tiger – Chinese phrase for an ineffectual threat
- Point of no return – Point beyond which turning back is no longer possible
- Red line (phrase) – Figurative phrase meaning a limit
- Red lines in the Russo-Ukrainian war – Veiled threats of engagement
- Trump Always Chickens Out – Phrase describing policies of the Trump administration
- Ultimatum – Final demand backed up by a threat
- Wolf warrior diplomacy – 21st-century Chinese diplomatic tactic
