= List of Latin phrases (A) =

This page is one of a series listing English translations of notable Latin phrases, such as veni, vidi, vici and et cetera. Some of the phrases are themselves translations of Greek phrases, as ancient Greek rhetoric and literature started centuries before the beginning of Latin literature in ancient Rome.

Latin	Translation	Notes
a bene placito	from one well pleased	i.e., "at will" or "at one's pleasure". This phrase, and its Italian (beneplacito) and Spanish (beneplácito) derivatives, are synonymous with the more common ad libitum (at pleasure).
a capite ad calcem	from head to heel	i.e., "from top to bottom", "all the way through", or "from head to toe". See also a pedibus usque ad caput.
a contrario	from the opposite	i.e., "on the contrary" or "au contraire". Thus, an argumentum a contrario ("argument from the contrary") is an argument or proof by contrast or direct opposite.
a Deucalione	from or since Deucalion	A long time ago; from Gaius Lucilius, Satires VI, 284
a falsis principiis proficisci	to set forth from false principles	Legal phrase. From Cicero, De Finibus IV.53.
a fortiori	from the stronger	i.e., "even more so" or "with even stronger reason". Often used to lead from a less certain proposition to a more evident corollary.
a fronte praecipitium, a tergo lupi	a precipice in front, wolves behind	Being in a dilemma. From Plautus, listed in Adagia by Erasmus. See also: "between a rock and a hard place", "between the devil and the deep blue sea".
a maiore ad minus	from the greater to the smaller	From general to particular; "What holds for all X also holds for one particular X." – argument a fortiori
a minore ad maius	from the smaller to the greater	An inference from smaller to bigger; what is forbidden at least is forbidden at more ("If riding a bicycle with two on it is forbidden, riding it with three on it is at least similarly punished.")
a pedibus usque ad caput	from feet to head	i.e., "completely", "from tip to toe", "from head to toe". Equally a capite ad calcem. See also ab ovo usque ad mala.
a posse ad esse	from being able to being	"From possibility to actuality" or "from being possible to being actual".
a posteriori	from the latter	Based on observation, i. e., empirical evidence. Opposite of a priori. Used in mathematics and logic to denote something that is known after a proof has been carried out. In philosophy, used to denote something known from experience.
a priori	from the former	Presupposed independent of experience; the reverse of a posteriori. Used in mathematics and logic to denote something that is known or postulated before a proof has been carried out. In philosophy, used to denote something is supposed without empirical evidence. In everyday speech, it denotes something occurring or being known before the event.
a solis ortu usque ad occasum	from sunrise to sunset	
ab absurdo	from the absurd	Said of an argument either for a conclusion that rests on the alleged absurdity of an opponent's argument (cf. appeal to ridicule) or that another assertion is false because it is absurd. The phrase is distinct from reductio ad absurdum, which is usually a valid logical argument.
ab abusu ad usum non valet consequentia	The inference of a use from its abuse is not valid	i.e., a right is still a right even if it is abused (e.g. practiced in a morally/ethically wrong way); cf. § abusus non tollit usum.
ab aeterno	from the eternal	Literally, "from the everlasting", "from eternity", or "from outside of time". Philosophically and theologically, it indicates something, e. g., the universe, that was created from outside of time. Sometimes used incorrectly to denote something, not from without time, but from a point within time, i.e. "from time immemorial", "since the beginning of time". or "from an infinitely remote time in the past")
ab antiquo	from the ancient	i.e., from ancient times
ab epistulis	from the letters	Regarding or pertaining to correspondence. Ab epistulis was originally the title of the secretarial office in the Roman Empire
ab extra	from beyond/without	Legal term denoting derivation from an external source, as opposed to a person's self or mind—the latter of which is denoted by ab intra.
ab hinc	from here on	Also sometimes written as "abhinc"
ab imo pectore	from the deepest chest	i.e., "from the bottom of my heart", "with deepest affection", or "sincerely". Attributed to Julius Caesar.
ab inconvenienti	from an inconvenient thing	Neo-Latin for "based on unsuitability", "from inconvenience", or "from hardship". An argumentum ab inconvenienti is one based on the difficulties involved in pursuing a line of reasoning, and is thus a form of appeal to consequences. The phrase refers to the legal principle that an argument from inconvenience has great weight.
ab incunabulis	from the cradle	i.e., "from the beginning" or "from infancy". Incunabula is commonly used in English to refer to the earliest stage or origin of something, and especially to copies of books that predate the spread of the printing press c. AD 1500.
ab initio	from the beginning	i.e., "from the outset", referring to an inquiry or investigation. Ab initio mundi means "from the beginning of the world". In literature, it refers to a story told from the beginning rather than in medias res ('from the middle'). In science, it refers to the first principles. In other contexts, it often refers to beginner or training courses. In law, it refers to a thing being true from its beginning or from the instant of the act, rather than from when the court declared it so. Likewise, an annulment is a judicial declaration of the invalidity or nullity of a marriage ab initio: the so-called marriage was "no thing" (Latin: nullius, from which the word "nullity" derives) and never existed, except perhaps in name only.
ab intestato	from an intestate	i.e., from a (dead) decedent, who died without executing a legal will; cf. ex testamento
ab intra	from within	i.e., from the inside, as opposed to ab extra ("from without").
ab invito	against one's will	
ab irato	from/by an angry person	More literally, "from/by an angry man". Though the form irato is masculine, the application of the phrase is not limited to men. Rather, "person" is meant because the phrase probably elides homo ("man/person"), not vir ("man"). It is used in law to describe a decision or action that is motivated by hatred or anger instead of reason and is detrimental to those whom it affects.
ab origine	from the source	i.e., from the origin, beginning, source, or commencement; or, "originally". Root of the word aboriginal.
ab ovo	from the egg	i.e., from the beginning or origin. Derived from the longer phrase in Horace's Satire 1.3: "ab ovo usque ad mala", meaning "from the egg to the apples", referring to how Ancient Roman meals would typically begin with an egg dish and end with fruit (cf. the English phrase soup to nuts). Thus, ab ovo means "from the beginning", and can connote thoroughness.
absens haeres non erit	an absent person will not be an heir	Legal principle that a person who is not present is unlikely to inherit.
absente reo (abs. re.)	[with] the defendant being absent	Legal phrase denoting action "in the absence of the accused".
absit iniuria	absent from injury	i.e., "no offense", meaning to wish that no insult or injury be presumed or done by the speaker's words. Also rendered as absit iniuria verbis ("let injury be absent from these words"). cf. absit invidia.
absit invidia	absent from envy	As opposed to "no offense", absit invidia is said in the context of a statement of excellence, to ward off envious deities who might interpret a statement of excellence as hubris. Also extended to absit invidia verbo ("may ill will/envy be absent from these words"). cf. absit iniuria verbis.
absit omen	absent from omen	i.e., "let this not be a bad omen", expressing the hope that something ill-boding does not turn out to be bad luck in the future.
absolutum dominium	absolute dominion	i.e., total or supreme power, dominion, ownership, or sovereignty
absolvo	I absolve	Legal term pronounced by a judge in order to acquit a defendant following their trial. Te absolvo or absolvo te ("I forgive you") is said by Catholic priests during the Sacrament of Confession, prior to the Second Vatican Council and in vernacular thereafter.
abundans cautela non nocet	abundant caution does no harm	i.e., "one can never be too careful"
ab uno disce omnes	from one, learn all	Refers to situations in which a single example or observation indicates a general or universal truth. Coined in Virgil, Aeneid II 65-6. Example: visible in the court of King Silas in the American television series Kings.
ab urbe condita (AUC)	from the founding of the City	i.e., "from the founding of Rome", which occurred in 753 BC, according to Livy. It was used as a referential year in ancient Rome from which subsequent years were calculated, prior to being replaced by other dating conventions. Also anno urbis conditae (AUC), literally "in the year of the founded city".
abusus non tollit usum	misuse does not remove use	The misuse of some thing does not eliminate the possibility of its correct use. cf. ab abusu ad usum non valet consequentia
ab utili	from utility	Used of an argument
abyssus abyssum invocat	deep calleth unto deep	From Psalms 42:7; some translations have "sea calls to sea".
accipe hoc	take this	Motto of the 848 Naval Air Squadron, British Royal Navy
accusare nemo se debet nisi coram Deo	no one ought to accuse himself except in the presence of God	Legal principle denoting that an accused person is entitled to plead not guilty, and that a witness is not obligated to respond or submit a document that would incriminate himself. A similar phrase is nemo tenetur se ipsum accusare ("no one is bound to accuse himself").
acta deos numquam mortalia fallunt	mortal actions never deceive the gods	Derived from Ovid, Tristia, I.ii, 97: si tamen acta deos numquam mortalia fallunt, / a culpa facinus scitis abesse mea. ("Yet if mortal actions never deceive the gods, / you know that crime was absent from my fault.")
acta est fabula plaudite	The play has been performed; applaud!	Common ending to ancient Roman comedies: Suetonius claimed in The Twelve Caesars that these were the last words of Augustus; Sibelius applied them to the third movement of his String Quartet No. 2, so that his audience would recognize that it was the last one, because a fourth would be ordinarily expected.
acta non verba	Deeds not Words	Motto of the United States Merchant Marine Academy.
acta sanctorum	Deeds of the Saints	Also used in the singular preceding a saint's name: Acta Sancti ("Deeds of Saint") N.; a common title of hagiography works
actiones secundum fidei	action follows belief	i.e., "we act according to what we believe (ourselves to be)."
actore non probante reus absolvitur	A defendant is exonerated by the failure of the prosecution to prove its case	presumption of innocence
actus me invito factus non est meus actus	the act done by me against my will is not my act	
actus non facit reum nisi mens sit rea	The act does not make [a person] guilty unless the mind should be guilty.	Legal principle of the presumption of mens rea in a crime
actus reus	guilty act	The actual crime that is committed, as opposed to the intent, thinking, and rationalizing that procured the criminal act; the external elements of a crime, rather than the internal elements (i.e. mens rea).
ad absurdum	to absurdity	In logic, to the point of being silly or nonsensical. See also reductio ad absurdum. Not to be confused with ab absurdo ("from the absurd").
ad abundantiam	to abundance	Used in legal language when providing additional evidence to an already sufficient collection. Also used commonly as an equivalent of "as if this wasn't enough".
ad acta	to the archives	Denoting the irrelevance of a thing
ad agendum semper parati	Always be prepared for action	Motto of Happy Grove High School in Hector's River, Jamaica.
ad altiora tendo	I strive towards higher things	
ad arbitrium	at will, at pleasure	
ad astra	to the stars	A common name or motto, in whole or part, among many publications
ad astra per aspera	to the stars through difficulties	i.e., "a rough road leads to the stars", as on the Launch Complex 34 memorial plaque for the astronauts of Apollo 1. Used as a motto by the State of Kansas and other organisations
ad augusta per angusta	through difficulties to honours	i.e., to rise to a high position overcoming hardships.
ad captandum vulgus	to captivate the mob	i.e., to appeal to the masses. Often said of or used by politicians. Likewise, an argumentum ad captandum is an argument designed to please the crowd.
ad clerum	to the clergy	Formal letter or communication in the Christian tradition from a bishop to his clergy. An ad clerum may be an encouragement in a time of celebration or a technical explanation of new regulations or canons.
ad coelum or a caelo usque ad centrum	from the sky to the center	i.e., "from Heaven all the way to the center of the Earth". In law, it may refer to the proprietary principle of cuius est solum, eius est usque ad coelum et ad inferos ("whosesoever is the soil, it is his up to the sky and down to the depths [of the Earth]").
ad eundem	to the same	An ad eundem degree (derived from ad eundem gradum, "to the same step or degree") is a courtesy degree awarded by a university or college to an alumnus of another. Rather than an honorary degree, it is a recognition of the formal learning for which the degree was earned at another college.
ad fontes	to the sources	Motto of Renaissance humanism and the Protestant Reformation
ad fundum	to the bottom	i.e., "bottoms up!" (during a generic toast) or "back to the basics", depending on context.
ad hoc	to this	i.e., "for this", in the sense of improvised or intended only for a specific, immediate purpose.
ad hominem	to/at the man	Provides the term argumentum ad hominem, a logical fallacy in which a person themselves is criticized, when the subject of debate is their idea or argument, on the mistaken assumption that the soundness of an argument is dependent on the qualities of the proponent.
ad honorem	to/for the honour	i.e., not for the purpose of gaining any material reward
ad infinitum	to infinity	i.e., enduring forever. Used to designate a property which repeats in all cases in mathematical proof. Also used in philosophical contexts to mean "repeating in all cases".
ad interim (ad int.)	for the meantime	As in the term "chargé d'affaires ad interim", denoting a diplomatic officer who acts in place of an ambassador.
ad kalendas graecas	at the Greek Calends	i.e., "when pigs fly". Attributed by Suetonius in The Twelve Caesars to Augustus. The Calends were specific days of the Roman calendar, not of the Greek, and so the "Greek Kalends" would never occur.
ad libitum (ad lib)	toward pleasure	i.e, "according to what pleases" or "as you wish". In music and theatrical scripts, it typically indicates that the performer has the liberty to change or omit something. Ad lib is often, specifically used when one improvises or ignores limitations. Also used by some restaurants in favor of the colloquial "all you can eat or drink". Libitum comes from the past participle of libere ("to please").
ad limina apostolorum	to the thresholds of the Apostles	i.e., to Rome. Refers specifically to the quinquennial visit ad limina, a formal trip by Catholic bishops to visit the Pope every five years.
ad litem	to the lawsuit	Legal phrase referring to a party appointed by a court to act in a lawsuit on behalf of another party who is deemed incapable of representing himself or herself, such as a child. An individual who acts in this capacity is called a guardian ad litem.
ad locum (ad loc.)	at the place	Used to suggest looking for information about a term in the corresponding place in a cited work of reference.
ad lucem	to the light	frequently used motto for educational institutions
ad maiorem Dei gloriam (AMDG)	For the greater glory of God	motto of the Society of Jesus (Jesuits)
ad meliora	towards better things	Motto of St Patrick's College, Cavan, Ireland
ad mortem	to/at death	Medical phrase serving as a synonym for death
ad multos annos	to many years	Wish for a long life; similar to "many happy returns".
ad nauseam	to sickness	i.e., "to the point of disgust". Sometimes used as a humorous alternative to ad infinitum. An argumentum ad nauseam is a logical fallacy in which erroneous proof is proffered by prolonged repetition of the argument, i. e., the argument is repeated so many times that persons are "sick of it".
ad oculos	to the eyes	i.e., "obvious on sight" or "obvious to anyone that sees it"
ad pedem litterae	to the foot of the letter	i.e., "exactly as it is written", "to the letter", or "to the very last detail"
ad perpetuam memoriam	to the perpetual memory	Generally precedes "of" and a person's name, used to wish for someone to be remembered long after death
ad pondus omnium (ad pond om)	to the weight of all things	i.e., "considering everything's weight". The abbreviation was historically used by physicians and others to signify that the last prescribed ingredient is to weigh as much as all of the previously mentioned ones.
ad quod damnum	to whatever damage	i.e., "according to the harm" or "in proportion to the harm". The phrase is used in tort law as a measure of damages inflicted, implying that a remedy (if one exists) ought to correspond specifically and only to the damage suffered. cf. damnum absque iniuria.
ad referendum (ad ref)	to reference	i.e., subject to be proposed, provisionally approved, but still needing official approval. Not the same as a referendum.
ad rem	to the matter	i.e., "to the point" or "without digression"
ad rem classem paratus	ready for the fleet	Patch motto of the US Naval Station Norfolk
adsumus	here we are	Motto of the Brazilian Marine Corps. A prayer Adsumus, Sancte Spiritus (We stand before You, Holy Spirit) is typically said at the start of every session of an Ecumenical Council or Synod of Bishops in the Catholic Church.
ad susceptum perficiendum	in order to achieve what has been undertaken	Motto of the Association of Trust Schools
ad terminum qui praeteriit	for the term which has passed	Legal phrase for a writ of entry
ad undas	to the waves	i.e., "to Hell"
ad unum	to one	
ad usum Delphini	for the use of the Dauphin	Said of a work that has been expurgated of offensive or improper parts. Originates from editions of Greek and Roman classics which King Louis XIV of France had censored for his heir apparent, the Dauphin. Also rarely in usum Delphini ("into the use of the Dauphin").
ad usum proprium (ad us. propr.)	for one's own use	
ad utrumque paratus	prepared for either [alternative]	Motto of Lund University, with the implied alternatives being the book (study) and the sword (defending the nation in war), of the United States Marine Corps' III Marine Expeditionary Force and of the Spanish Submarine Force
ad valorem	according to value	Used in commerce to refer to ad valorem taxes, i.e., taxes based on the assessed value of real estate or personal property
ad victoriam	to/for victory	Used as a battle cry by the Romans.
ad vitam aeternam	to eternal life	i.e., "to life everlasting". A common Biblical phrase
ad vitam aut culpam	for life or until fault	Used in reference to the ending of a political term upon the death or downfall of the officer (demise as in their commission of a sufficiently grave immorality and/or legal crime).
addendum	thing to be added	i.e., an item to be added, especially as a supplement to a book. The plural is addenda.
adaequatio intellectus et rei	correspondence of mind and reality	One of the classic definitions of "truth:" when the mind has the same form as reality, we think truth. Also rendered as adaequatio intellectus et rei.
adaequatio intellectus nostri cum re	conformity of intellect to the fact	Phrase used in epistemology regarding the nature of understanding.
adsum	I am here	i.e., "present!" or "here!" The opposite of absum ("I am absent").
adtigo planitia Lunae	I will reach the plains of the Moon	Insignia motto of the American IM-1 lunar mission.
adversus solem ne loquitor	do not speak against the Sun	i.e., "do not argue what is obviously/manifestly incorrect."
advocatus diaboli	Devil's advocate	Someone who, in the face of a specific argument, voices an argument that he does not necessarily accept, for the sake of argument and discovering the truth by testing the opponent's argument. cf. arguendo.
aegri somnia	a sick man's dreams	i.e., "troubled dreams". From Horace, Ars Poetica VII 7.
aes alienum	foreign debt	i.e., "someone else's money"
aetatis suae (aetatis, aetat. or aet.)	of his age or in the year of his age	The word aetatis means "of age" (e.g. "aetatis 36" denotes being "of year of age 36" or "in the 36th year of age". Because the first year of age is entered at birth, this is equivalent to "aged 35 years old".) Appears on portraits, gravestones, monuments, etc. Usually preceded by anno (AAS), "in the year # [of his age/life]". Frequently combined with Anno Domini, giving a date as both the age of Jesus Christ and the age of the decedent. Example: "Obiit anno Domini MDCXXXVI^{o} (tricensimo sexto), [anno] aetatis suae XXV^{o} (vicensimo quinto)" ("he died in the 1636th year of the Lord, [being] the 25th [year] of his age[/life]").
affidavit	he asserted	Legal term derived from fides ("faith"), originating at least from Medieval Latin to denote a statement under oath.
age quod agis	do what you do	i.e., "do what you are doing," or "do well whatever you do." Figuratively, it means "keep going, because you are inspired or dedicated to do so." This is the motto of several Catholic schools, and was also used by Pope John XXIII in the sense of "do not be concerned with any other matter than the task in hand;" he was allaying worry of what would become of him in the future: his sense of age quod agis was "joy" regarding what is presently occurring and "detachment" from concern of the future.
agere sequitur esse agere sequitur (esse)	action follows being	Metaphysical and moral principle that indicates the connection of ontology, obligation, and ethics.
Agnus Dei	Lamb of God	Refers both to the innocence of a lamb and to Christ being a sacrificial lamb after the Jewish religious practice. It is the Latin translation from John 1:36, when St. John the Baptist exclaimes "Ecce Agnus Dei!" ("Behold the Lamb of God!") upon seeing Jesus Christ.
alea iacta est	the die has been cast	Said by Julius Caesar (Greek: ἀνερρίφθω κύβος, anerrhíphthō kýbos) upon crossing the Rubicon in 49 BC, according to Suetonius. The original meaning was similar to "the game is afoot", but its modern meaning, like that of the phrase "crossing the Rubicon", denotes passing the point of no return on a momentous decision and entering into a risky endeavor where the outcome is left to chance.
alenda lux ubi orta libertas	Let light be nourished where liberty has arisen	"Light" meaning learning. Motto of Davidson College.
alias	at another time, otherwise	An assumed name or pseudonym; similar to alter ego, but more specifically referring to a name, not to a "second self".
alibi	elsewhere	Legal defense where a defendant attempts to show that he was elsewhere at the time a crime was committed (e.g. "his alibi is sound; he gave evidence that he was in another city on the night of the murder.")
aliquid stat pro aliquo	something stands for something else	Foundational definition in semiotics.
alis aquilae	on an eagle's wings	From Isaiah 40: "But those who wait for the Lord shall find their strength renewed, they shall mount up on wings like eagles, they shall run and not grow weary, they shall walk and not grow faint."
alis grave nil	nothing [is] heavy with wings	i.e., "nothing is heavy to those who have wings"; motto of the Pontifical Catholic University of Rio de Janeiro, Brazil
alis volat propriis	she flies with her own wings	Motto of the State of Oregon, adopted in 1987, replacing the previous state motto of "The Union", which was adopted in 1957.
alma mater	nourishing mother	Term used for the university one attends or has attended. Another university term, matriculation, is also derived from mater. The term suggests that the students are "fed" knowledge and taken care of by the university. It is also used for a university's traditional school anthem.
alter ego	another I	i.e., another self, a second persona or alias. Can be used to describe different facets or identities of a single character, or different characters who seem representations of the same personality. Often used of a fictional character's secret identity.
alterius non sit qui suus esse potest	let no man be another's who can be his own	Usually attributed to Cicero, the phrase is the final sentence in Aesop's ascribed fable "The Frogs Who Desired a King" as appears in the collection commonly known as the "Anonymus Neveleti", in Fable 21B: De ranis a Iove querentibus regem. Used as a motto by Paracelsus.
alterum non laedere	to not wound another	One of the three basic legal precepts in the Digest of Justinian I.
alumnus, or, alumna	pupil	Graduate or former student of a school, college, or university. Plural of alumnus is alumni (male). Plural of alumna is alumnae (female).
a mari usque ad mare	from sea to sea	From Psalm 72:8, "Et dominabitur a mari usque ad mare, et a flumine usque ad terminos terrae" (KJV: "He shall have dominion also from sea to sea, and from the river unto the ends of the earth"). National motto of Canada.
amat victoria curam	victory favours care	Motto of several schools
amicus certus in re incerta	a sure friend in an unsure matter	From Ennius, as quoted by Cicero in Laelius de Amicitia, s. 64
amicus curiae	friend of the court	i.e., an adviser, or a person who can obtain or grant access to the favour of a powerful group (e. g., the Roman Curia). In current U.S. legal usage, an amicus curiae is a third party who is allowed to submit a legal opinion in the form of an amicus brief to the court.
Amicus Plato, sed magis amica veritas.	Plato is my friend, but truth is a better friend.	An assertion that truth is more valuable than friendship. Attributed to Aristotle, Nicomachean Ethics, 1096a15; and Roger Bacon, Opus Majus, Part 1, Chapter 5.
amicus usque ad aras	a friend as far as to the altars	"a friend as far as to the altars", "a friend whose only higher allegiance is to religion", "a friend to the very end".
amittere legem terrae	to lose the law of the land	An obsolete legal phrase signifying the forfeiture of the right of swearing in any court or cause, or to become infamous.
amor Dei intellectualis	intellectual love of God	From Baruch Spinoza
amor et melle et felle est fecundissimus	love is rich with both honey and venom	From Act One, Scene One of Plautus’ play Cistellaria.
amor fati	love of fate	Nietzscheian alternative worldview to that represented through memento mori ("remember you must die"): Nietzsche believed amor fati was more affirmative of life.
amor omnibus idem	love is the same for all	From Virgil, Georgics III
amor patriae	love of the fatherland	i.e., "love of the nation;" patriotism
amor vincit omnia	love conquers all	Originally from Virgil, Eclogues X, 69: omnia vincit amor: et nos cedamus amori ("love conquers all: let us too surrender to love"). The phrase is inscribed on a bracelet worn by the Prioress in Chaucer's Canterbury Tales.
An nescis, mi fili, quantilla prudentia mundus regatur?	Do you not know, my son, with how little wisdom the world is governed?	Written by Axel Oxenstierna in a letter to encourage his son, a delegate to the negotiations that would lead to the Peace of Westphalia, who worried about his ability to hold his own amidst experienced and eminent statesmen and diplomats.
anglice	in English	Used before the anglicized version of a word or name. For example, "Terra Mariae, anglice, Maryland".
animus in consulendo liber	a mind unfettered in deliberation	Motto of NATO
anno (an.)	in the year	Also used in such phrases as anno urbis conditae (see ab urbe condita), Anno Domini, and anno regni.
anno Domini (A.D.)	in the year of our Lord	Abbreviation of Anno Domini Nostri Jesu Christi ("in the year of Our Lord Jesus Christ"), the predominantly-used system for dating years across the world; used with the Gregorian Calendar and based on the perceived year of the birth of Jesus Christ. The years before His birth were formerly signified by a. C. n (ante Christum natum, "before Christ was born"), but now use the English abbreviation "BC" ("before Christ"). For example, Augustus was born in the year 63 BC and died in AD 14.
anno regni	In the year of the reign	Precedes "of" and the current ruler
annuit cœptis	he nods at things now begun	i.e., "he approves our undertakings." Motto on the reverse of the Great Seal of the United States and, consequently, on the reverse of the United States one-dollar bill; in this context the motto refers to God.
annus horribilis	horrible year	Variation on annus mirabilis, recorded in print from 1890. Notably used in a speech by Queen Elizabeth II to describe what a bad year 1992 had been for her. In Classical Latin, this phrase actually means "terrifying year". See also annus terribilis.
annus mirabilis	wonderful year	Used particularly to refer to the years 1665 and 1666, during which Isaac Newton made revolutionary inventions and discoveries in calculus, motion, optics and gravitation. Annus Mirabilis is also the title of a poem by John Dryden written in the same year. It has since been used to refer to other years, especially to 1905, when Albert Einstein made equally revolutionary discoveries concerning the photoelectric effect, Brownian motion, mass-energy equivalence, and the special theory of relativity. (See Annus Mirabilis papers) another use was the Annus Mirabilis of 1759 to commemorate the string of victories won by Britain and her allies.
annus terribilis	dreadful year	Used to describe 1348, the year the Black Death began to afflict Europe.
ante bellum	before the war	As in status quo ante bellum ("as it was before the war"); commonly used as antebellum to refer to the period preceding the American Civil War, primarily in reference to the Southern United States at that time.
ante cibum (a.c.)	before food	Medical shorthand for "before meals"
ante faciem Domini	before the face of the Lord	Motto of the Christian Brothers College, Adelaide
ante litteram	before the letter	Said of an expression or term that describes something which existed before the phrase itself was introduced or became common. Example: Alan Turing was a computer scientist ante litteram, since the field of "computer science" was not yet recognized in Turing's day.
ante meridiem (a.m.)	before midday	From midnight to noon; confer post meridiem
ante mortem	before death	See post mortem ("after death")
ante omnia armari	before all else, be armed	
ante prandium (a.p.)	before lunch	Used on pharmaceutical prescriptions to denote "before a meal". Less common is post prandium ("after lunch").
antiqui colant antiquum dierum	let the ancients worship the ancient of days	The motto of Chester
aperire terram gentibus	open the land to nations	Motto of Ferdinand de Lesseps referring to the Suez and Panama Canals. Also appears on a plaque at Kinshasa train station.
apparatus criticus	tools of a critic	Textual notes or a list of other readings relating to a document, especially in a scholarly edition of a text.
apologia pro vita sua	defense of one's life	
apud	in the writings of	Used in scholarly works to cite a reference at second hand
aqua (aq.)	water	
aqua fortis	strong water	Refers to nitric acid, thus called because of its ability to dissolve all materials except gold and platinum
aqua pura	pure water	Or, "clear water" or "clean water"
aqua regia	royal water	Refers to a mixture of hydrochloric acid and nitric acid, thus called because of its ability to dissolve gold and platinum
aqua vitae	water of life	"Spirit of Wine" in many English texts. Used to refer to various native distilled beverages, such as whisky (uisge beatha) in Scotland and Ireland, gin in the Netherlands, brandy (eau de vie) in France, and akvavit in Scandinavia.
aquila non capit muscas	an eagle does not catch flies	Or, "a noble or important person does not deal with insignificant matters"
arare litus	to plough the seashore	Desiderius Erasmus, Adagia (AD 1508); meaning "wasted labor"
arbiter elegantiarum	judge of tastes	One who prescribes, rules on, or is a recognized authority on matters of social behavior and taste. Said of Petronius. Sometimes found in the singular as arbiter elegantiae ("judge of taste").
arcana imperii	the secrets of power	Originally used by Tacitus to refer to the state secrets and unaccountable acts of the Roman imperial government
arcanum boni tenoris animae	The secret behind a good mood	Motto of the Starobrno Brewery in Brno
arcus senilis	bow of an old person	An opaque circle around the cornea of the eye, often seen in elderly people. When it is found in patients less than 50 years old it is termed arcus juvenilis
arduus ad solem	Striving towards the Sun	Motto of Victoria University of Manchester
argentum album	white silver	Also "silver coin"; mentioned in the Domesday Book; signifies bullion or silver uncoined
arguendo	for arguing	Or, "for the sake of argument". Said when something is done purely in order to discuss a matter or illustrate a point. E. g., "let us assume, arguendo, that your claim is correct."
argumentum	argument	Or "reasoning", "inference", "appeal", or "proof". The plural is argumenta. Commonly used in the names of logical arguments and fallacies, preceding phrases such as a silentio (by silence), ad antiquitatem (to antiquity), ad baculum (to the stick), ad captandum (to capturing), ad consequentiam (to the consequence), ad crumenam (to the purse), ad feminam (to the woman), ad hominem (to the person), ad ignorantiam (to ignorance), ad invidiam (to envy/jealousy/odium/hatred/reproach – appealing to low passions), ad judicium (to judgment), ad lazarum (to poverty), ad logicam (to logic), ad metum (to fear), ad misericordiam (to pity), ad nauseam (to nausea), ad novitatem (to novelty), ad personam (to the character), ad numerum (to the number), ad odium (to spite), ad populum (to the people), ad temperantiam (to moderation), ad verecundiam (to reverence), ex silentio (from silence), in terrorem (into terror), and e contrario (from/to the opposite).
arma christi	weapons of Christ	also known as Instruments of the Passion are the objects associated with the Passion of Jesus Christ in Christian symbolism and art. They are seen as arms in the sense of heraldry, and also as the weapons Christ used to achieve his conquest over Satan.
armata potentia	armed and powerful	charge made by a Justice of the Peace in Medieval England against those who rode in arms against the King's Peace.
ars celare artem	art [is] to conceal art	An aesthetic ideal that good art should appear natural rather than contrived. Of medieval origin, but often incorrectly attributed to Ovid.
ars gratia artis	art for the sake of art	Translated into Latin from Baudelaire's L'art pour l'art. Motto of Metro-Goldwyn-Mayer. While symmetrical for the logo of MGM, the better word order in Latin is "Ars artis gratia".
ars longa, vita brevis	art is long, life is short	Seneca, De Brevitate Vitae, 1.1, translating a phrase of Hippocrates that is often used out of context. The "art" referred to in the original aphorism was the craft of medicine, which took a lifetime to acquire.
arte et labore	by art and by labour	Motto of Blackburn Rovers F.C.
arte et marte	by skill and by fighting	Motto of the Royal Electrical and Mechanical Engineers of the British Army and Electrical and Mechanical Engineering (EME) Branch of the Canadian Forces
Artis Bohemiae Amicis	Friends of Czech Arts	Award of the Minister of Culture of the Czech Republic for the promotion of the positive reputation of Czech culture abroad
asinus ad lyram	an ass to the lyre	Desiderius Erasmus, Adagia (AD 1508); meaning "an awkward or incompetent individual"
asinus asinum fricat	the jackass rubs the jackass	Used to describe 2 persons who are lavishing excessive praise on one another
assecuratus non quaerit lucrum sed agit ne in damno sit	the assured does not seek profit but makes [it his profit] that he not be in loss	Refers to the insurance principle that the indemnity can not be larger than the loss
Astra castra, numen lumen	The stars my camp, the Deity my light.	
astra inclinant, sed non obligant	the stars incline us, they do not bind us	Refers to the distinction of free will from astrological determinism
auctores varii	various authors	Used in bibliography for books, texts, publications, or articles that have more than 3 collaborators
auctoritas	authority	Level of prestige a person had in Roman society
auctoritas non veritas facit legem	authority, not truth, makes law	This formula appears in the 1668 Latin revised edition of Thomas Hobbes's Leviathan, book 2, chapter 26, p. 133.
audacia pro muro et scuto opus	boldness is our wall, action is our shield	Cornelis Jol, in a bid to rally his rebellious captains to fight and conquer the Spanish treasure fleet in 1638.
audacter calumniare, semper aliquid haeret	slander boldly, something always sticks	Francis Bacon, De Augmentis Scientiarum (AD 1623)
audax at fidelis	bold but faithful	Motto of Queensland, Australia
audeamus	let us dare	Motto of the Canadian Special Operations Regiment [CSOR] on their regimental coat of arms; of Otago University Students' Association, a direct response to the university's motto of sapere aude ("dare to be wise"); and of Champlain College in Burlington, Vermont.
audemus jura nostra defendere	we dare to defend our rights	Motto of the State of Alabama, adopted in 1923; translated into Latin from a paraphrase of the stanza "Men who their duties know / But know their rights, and knowing, dare maintain" from William Jones, "What Constitutes a State?"
audentes fortuna iuvat	Fortune favors the bold	From Virgil, Aeneid, Book 10, 284, where the first word is in an archaic form, audentis fortuna iuvat. Allegedly the last words of Pliny the Elder before he left the docks at Pompeii to rescue people from the eruption of Vesuvius in 79. Often quoted as audaces fortuna iuvat. Also the motto of the Portuguese Army Commandos and the USS Montpelier in the latter form.
audere est facere	to dare is to do	Motto of Tottenham Hotspur F.C.
audi alteram partem	hear the other side	Legal principle; also worded as audiatur et altera pars ("let the other side be heard also")
audio hostem	I hear the enemy	Motto of the 845 NAS Royal Navy
audi, vide, tace	hear, see, be silent	
aurea mediocritas	golden mean	From Horace's Odes, 2, 10. Refers to the ethical goal of reaching a virtuous middle ground between two sinful extremes. The golden mean concept is common to many philosophers, chiefly Aristotle.
auri sacra fames	accursed hunger for gold	From Virgil, Aeneid, Book 3, 57. Later quoted by Seneca as quod non mortalia pectora coges, auri sacra fames ("what do not you force mortal hearts [to do], accursed hunger for gold").
auribus teneo lupum	I hold a wolf by the ears	Common ancient proverb, this version from Terence. It indicates that one is in a dangerous situation where both holding on and letting go could be deadly. A modern version is "to have a tiger by the tail".
aurora australis	southern dawn	The Southern Lights, an aurora that appears in the Southern Hemisphere. It is less well-known than the Northern Lights (aurorea borealis). The Aurora Australis is also the name of an Antarctic icebreaker ship.
aurora borealis	northern dawn	The Northern Lights, an aurora that appears in the Northern Hemisphere.
aurora musis amica	dawn is a friend to the muses	Title of a distich by Iohannes Christenius (1599–1672): "Conveniens studiis non est nox, commoda lux est; / Luce labor bonus est et bona nocte quies." ("Night is not suitable for studying, daylight is; / working by light is good, as is rest at night."); in Nihus, Barthold (1642). Epigrammata disticha. Johannes Kinckius.
aurum potestas est	gold is power	Motto of the fictional Fowl Family in the Artemis Fowl series, written by Eoin Colfer
auspicium melioris aevi	hope/token of a better age	Motto of the Order of St Michael and St George and of Raffles Institution in Singapore
Austriae est imperare orbi universo (A.E.I.O.U.)	Austria is to rule the whole world	Motto of the House of Habsburg, coined by Frederick III, Holy Roman Emperor
aut Caesar aut nihil	either Caesar or nothing	Denotes an absolute aspiration to become the Emperor, or the equivalent supreme magistrate, and nothing else. More generally, "all or nothing". A personal motto of Cesare Borgia. Charlie Chaplin also used the phrase in The Great Dictator to ridicule Hynkel's (Chaplin's parody of Hitler) ambition for power, but substituted "nullus" for "nihil".
aut consilio aut ense	either by meeting or the sword	I. e., either through reasoned discussion or through war. It was the first motto of Chile (see coat of arms), changed to Spanish: Por la razón o la fuerza. Name of episode 1 in season 3 of Berlin Station.
aut cum scuto aut in scuto	either with shield or on shield	Or, "do or die" or "no retreat". A Greek expression («Ἢ τὰν ἢ ἐπὶ τᾶς») that Spartan mothers said to their sons as they departed for battle. It refers to the practices that a Greek hoplite would drop his cumbersome shield in order to flee the battlefield, and a slain warrior would be borne home atop his shield.
aut imiteris aut oderis	imitate or loathe it	Seneca the Younger, Epistulae morales ad Lucilium, 7:7. From the full phrase: "necesse est aut imiteris aut oderis" ("you must either imitate or loathe the world").
aut neca aut necare	either kill or be killed	Also: "neca ne neceris" ("kill lest you be killed")
aut pax aut bellum	either peace or war	Motto of the Gunn Clan
aut simul stabunt aut simul cadent	they will either stand together or fall together	Said of two situations that can only occur simultaneously: if one ends, so does the other, and vice versa.
aut viam inveniam aut faciam	I will either find a way or make one	Hannibal
aut vincere aut mori	either to conquer or to die	General pledge of victoria aut mors ("victory or death"). Motto of the Higgenbotham and Higginbottom families of Cheshire, England; participants in the War of the Roses. Also the motto for the United States 1st Fighter Wing, Langley Air Force Base in Virginia.
ave atque vale	hail and farewell	Catullus, Carmen 101, addressed to his deceased brother
Ave Christus Rex	Hail, Christ the King!	Christian phrase signaling devotion to Jesus Christ
ave Europa nostra vera patria	hail Europe, our true fatherland	Anthem of Imperium Europa
Ave Imperator, morituri te salutant	Hail, Emperor! Those who are about to die salute you!	From Suetonius' The Twelve Caesars, Claudius 21. A salute and plea for mercy recorded on one occasion by naumachiarii–captives and criminals fated to die fighting during mock naval encounters. Later versions included a variant of "We who are about to die", and this translation is sometimes aided by changing the Latin to nos morituri te salutamus.
Ave Maria	Hail, Mary	Catholic prayer of intercession asking St. Mary, the Mother of Jesus Christ to pray for the petitioner
ave mater Angliae	Hail, Mother of England	Motto of Canterbury, England
