= Berengar =

- Gender: masculine
- Language: Germanic

Other gender
- Feminine: Berengaria

Other names
- Variant forms: Bérenger, Berengario, Berenguer, Berenguier, Berengier, Berengarius, Berenger, Bérenger, Bérangier, Beringer

Berengar is a masculine name derived from Germanic roots meaning "bear" and "spear". The name appears frequently among certain noble families during the Middle Ages, especially the Unruochings and those related. Bérenger is the French form, while Berengario is the Italian form, Berenguer is the Catalan form, and Berenguier or Berengier is the Occitan form. The Latin form is Berengarius and the female equivalent is Berengaria. Other forms of the name include Berenger, Bérenger, Bérangier, or Beringer.

== Personal name ==
- Berengar of Toulouse, Frankish nobleman (fl. ninth century)
- Berengar I of Neustria, Frankish nobleman (fl. ninth century)
- Berengar II of Neustria, Frankish nobleman (d. 896)
- Berengar I of Italy, King of Italy (c. 845–924)
- Berengar II of Italy, King of Italy (c. 900–966)
- Judicael Berengar, Breton nobleman (fl. tenth century)
- Berengar of Tours, theologian (c. 999–1088)
- Berengar (bishop of Venosa) (fl. eleventh century)
- Berengar of Poitiers (fl. twelfth century), controversialist
- Henry Berengar, junior co-King of Germany, sometimes numbered as Henry VI (1136/7–1150)
- Berenguier de Palazol, Catalan troubadour (fl. 1160–1209)
- Berengier Trobel, Occitan troubadour (fl. thirteenth century)
- Berenguer de Palou II, bishop of Barcelona (d. 1241)
- Berenguer d'Anoia, Catalan troubadour (fl. fourteenth century)
- Berengar Fredol the Elder (1250–1323), cardinal-bishop of Frascati
- Berengar Fredol the Younger (died 1323), cardinal-bishop of Porto
- Berengar Laurer (1938–2018), German artist
- Bérenger Saunière, French priest (1852–1917)

As a compound personal name

- Ramon Berenguer (disambiguation), multiple people
- Berenguer Ramon (disambiguation), multiple people

== Family name ==
- Álex Berenguer (born 1995), Spanish footballer
- Alphonse-Marie-Marcellin-Thomas Bérenger (1785–1866), French lawyer
- Florin Berenguer (born 1989), French footballer
- Henry Bérenger, (1867–1952) French senator, 1912–45; ambassador to the United States, 1926–28.
- Dámaso Berenguer (1873–1953), Spanish soldier and politician; 64th Prime Minister of Spain.
- Josep Renau Berenguer (1907–1982), Spanish artist
- Casimiro Berenguer (1909–2000), Puerto Rican Nationalist
- Joanna Bérenger (born 1989), Mauritian entertainer
- Marie Bérenger (1865–1944), French Resistance activist who opposed the Nazi occupation of France
- Pascal Berenguer (born 1981), French footballer
- Paul Bérenger (born 1945), Mauritian politician
- Tom Berenger (born 1949), American actor

== Fictional characters ==
- Bérenger, a character in the play Rhinoceros by Eugène Ionesco
- Bearenger, a character in Tails Sky Patrol
- Berengar of Arundel, a character in The Name of the Rose
- Berengar, a character in The Witcher (video game)
- Hugh Berengar, a character in The Cadfael Chronicles

== See also ==
- Beringer (disambiguation)
