= Bérengère =

Bérengère is a feminine name in the French language.

== People with the given name ==
- Bérangère Abba (born 1976), French politician
- Bérangère Couillard (born 1986), French politician
- Bérengère Dautun (born 1939), French actress
- Bérengère Fromy, French physiologist
- Bérengère Krief (born 1983), French actress and comedienne
- Bérangère Nau (born 1977), French former ice dancer
- Bérengère Poletti (born 1959), French politician and Member of the National Assembly
- Bérengère Schuh (born 1984), French archer

== See also ==
- Berengaria (disambiguation)
