= Quaestiones =

In rhetorical theory, the quaestiones (Latin: "questions") are the points being debated.

Quaestiones is also the title of numerous literary works, including in chronological order:

- the Tusculanae Disputationes of Roman statesman Cicero, around 45 BC
- the Quaestiones of Roman jurist Sextus Caecilius Africanus, around 160
- the Quaestiones disputatae de Veritate, 1256-1259.
- the Quaestiones quaedam philosophicae of English physicist Isaac Newton (1661)
