= Ab ovo =

Adverb meaning "from the beginning"

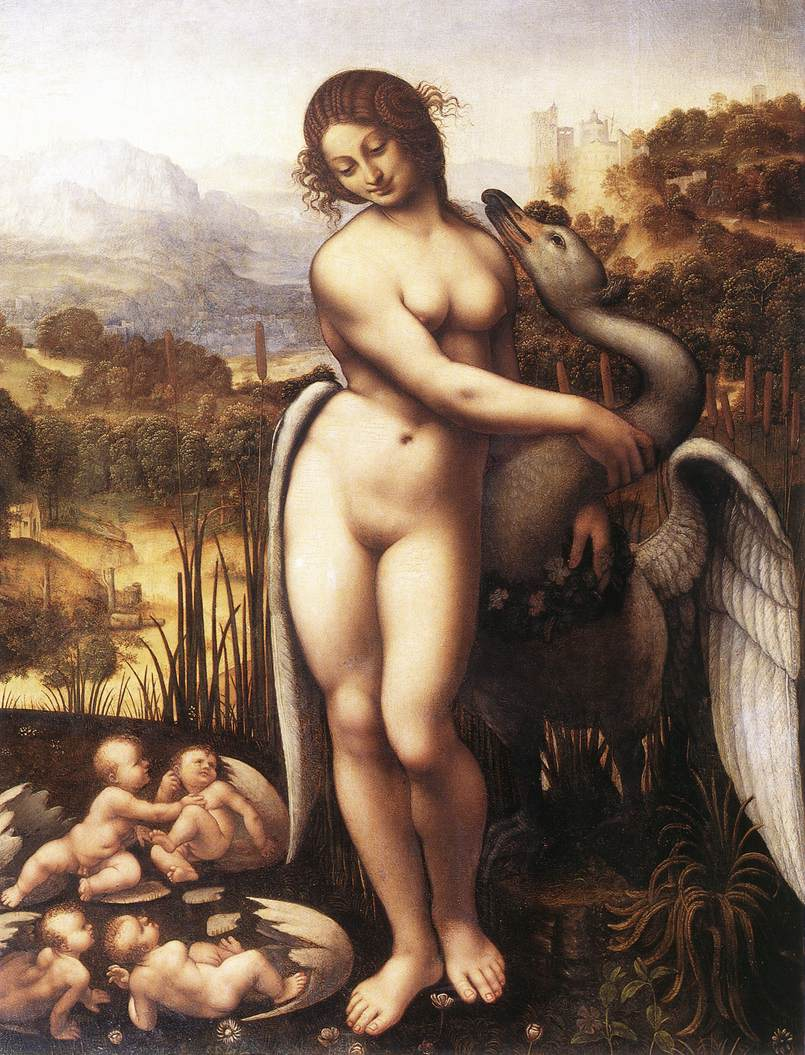
Leda and the Swan, a painting depicting Helen's unconventional birth, by Cesare da Sesto (c. 1506–1510, Wilton) after a lost painting by Leonardo da Vinci. Helen and Clytemnestra are shown emerging from one egg; Castor and Pollux from another.

Ab ovo is Latin for 'from the beginning' or 'from the origin', literally meaning 'from the egg'. The term is a reference to one of the twin eggs from which Helen of Troy was born. The eggs were laid by Leda after Zeus, disguised as a swan, either seduced and mated with or raped her, according to different versions. Had Leda not laid the egg, Helen would not have been born, so Paris could not have eloped with her, so there would have been no Trojan War.

== In literature ==
The English literary use of the phrase comes from Horace's Ars Poetica, where he describes his ideal epic poet as one who "does not begin the Trojan War from the double egg" (nec gemino bellum Troianum orditur ab ouo), the absolute beginning of events, the earliest possible chronological point, but snatches the listener into the middle of things (in medias res). This advice is famously rejected in Laurence Sterne's novel The Life and Opinions of Tristram Shandy, Gentleman.

This use is distinct from the longer phrase ab ovo usque ad mala (lit. "from the egg to the apples") which appears in Horace's Satire 1.3. It refers to the course of a Roman meal, which often began with eggs and ended with fruit, and is similar to the American English phrase "soup to nuts". Thus ab ovo can also be used to mean a complete or entire thing.

== See also ==
- Ab initio
- List of Latin phrases
