= Ad vitam aut culpam =

Scottish condition of appointment or tenure

Ad vitam aut culpam (Law Latin, which literally means "for life or fault") is a condition of appointment or tenure, and the corresponding principle of appointment, and the corresponding type of appointment or form of tenure, in Scotland. Under the law of Scotland, an office is said to be held ad vitam aut culpam, when the tenure of the possessor is determinable only by his death or delinquency; or, in other words, which is held quamdiu se bene gesserit.

The Claim of Right (1689) provides that the changing "the nature of the judges gifts ad vitam aut culpam into commissions durante beneplacito" is "contrary to law". That provision is subject to section 2(1) of the Judicial Pensions Act 1959 and section 26 of the Judicial Pensions and Retirement Act 1993.

Section 29 of the Heritable Jurisdictions (Scotland) Act 1746 (20 Geo. 2. c. 43) provided that each sheriff depute and stewart depute "shall, during the space of seven years from" 25 March 1748 "be nominated and appointed" with "such continuance as his Majesty, his heirs or successors shall think fit; and that after the end of the said seven years, the offices of sheriff depute and stewart depute shall be granted and held ad vitam aut culpam only". So much of the Heritable Jurisdictions (Scotland) Act 1746 as enacted "that after the end of seven years from and after" 25 March 1748 "the offices of sheriff depute and stewart depute shall be granted and held ad vitam aut culpam" was repealed by the Sheriffs (Scotland) Act 1755 (28 Geo. 2. c. 7), which further provided "that the sheriff deputes and stewart deputes already named or hereafter to be named shall, during the space of fifteen years from and after the expiration of the said seven years, hold and enjoy their respective offices for such continuance as his Majesty already hath, or his Majesty, his heirs or successors, shall hereafter think fit to appoint" and "that from and after the end of the said fifteen years, the offices of sheriff depute and stewart depute shall be granted and held ad vitam aut culpam only". The Sheriffs (Scotland) Act 1755 was repealed by the Second Schedule to the Sheriff Courts (Scotland) Act 1907 (7 Edw. 7. c. 51) (which also repealed section 29 of the Heritable Jurisdictions (Scotland) Act 1746), and replaced by section 13 of that Act, which did not contain the words "ad vitam aut culpam".

The applicability of this law was decided upon by the House of Lords in the case Stewart v. Secretary of State For Scotland where it was stated that it did not protect a sheriff from dismissal for inability. Further acts of Parliament empowered the Lord President of the Court of Session and the Lord Justice Clerk to remove sheriffs from office due to a personal inability to complete their function – differentiated from a mental incapacity or incapacity due to age. Therefore, ad vitam aut culpam has a limited applicability which does protect an officer from dismissal if they are incompetent.

== History ==
When one was appointed for life to an office, the qualifying condition was implied quamdiu se bene gesserit, and hence such an appointment was described as ad vitam aut culpam. The servant's interests were protected by giving him tenure for life; the master's interests were protected by giving him power to dismiss the servant for misbehaviour.

"Either the appointment must expressly bear that the appointee is to hold his office for life, or the office must be of such a nature that a life appointment is necessarily implied. In this last case are embraced only offices of the nature of munera publica. Public officers are irremoveable, except for fault" (per LP Inglis in Hastie, 4 June 1889, 16 R 715). At common law, it was held to be a principle of public policy that public officers should be protected in the independent exercise of their functions by the knowledge that they were irremoveable, except for misbehaviour. On this principle, it was believed, rested the life tenure of the judges of the Supreme Courts; of the beneficed ministers of the Church of Scotland; of sheriff clerks; of town clerks in royal burghs (Thomson, 1665, Mor 13090; Simpson, 1824, 3 S 150; Farish, 1836, 15 S 107); of parochial schoolmasters before 1872 (Duff, 1799, Mor 9576); and of many others. The life tenure of certain public officers was declared by Statute e.g. sheriff's (the Sheriffs (Scotland) Act 1755 (28 Geo. 2. c. 7)); sheriffs-substitute and procurators fiscal (the Sheriff Courts (Scotland) Act 1877 (40 & 41 Vict. c. 50), which substituted for "culpa", the words "inability or misbehaviour"). So inherent was this right in the nature of a public office, that in Duff (ut supra), an undertaking by a duly appointed parochial schoolmaster to remove at the pleasure of the heritors was found not to be binding; and in Simpson (ut supra), the appointment of town clerk in a royal burgh, expressly declared to be "during pleasure", was held to be an appointment ad vitam aut culpam. It was decided, however, that it was not contra bonos mores for the trustees of an endowed school to appoint a teacher removable at pleasure (Bell, 1838, 16 S 1136; affd 2 Rob App Ca 286); and it was held legal for commissioners acting under the Burgh Police Act 1862, s 67, to define their clerk's term of office (Hamilton, 1871, 9 M 826). By 1896, the tendency was to restrict the application of the rule.

Other officials of many kinds invoked the protection of the principle. Some succeeded to a substantial extent, inducing the Court to hold that they could not be removed arbitrarily or capriciously, but only for some reasonable cause, which, however, need not necessarily infer misbehaviour. Such were masters of grammar schools in royal burghs (Magistrates of Montrose, 1710, Mor 13118; Hastie, 1769, Mor 13132, 2 Pat App 277; Mitchell, 1883, 10 R 982). The session clerk of Glasgow was allowed similar protection (Harvie, 1756, Mor 13126); but it was subsequently decided that a session clerk, whose appointment was indefinite, held office only during pleasure (Anderson, 1779, Mor 13137). The following officials unsuccessfully contended that an indefinite appointment necessarily meant in their case one ad vitam aut culpam :—Extractors appointed by the Principal Clerks of Session (1741, Mor 13125); teachers in private schools (Mason, 1836, 14 S. 343; Gibson, 1837, 16 S 301, 1 Rob App Ca 16; Bell, ut supra); the clerk to the magistrates of a burgh of barony (Dykes, 1840, 2 D 1274); a collector of poor rates (Shaw, 1862, 24 D. 609); an ordained foreign missionary of the Church of Scotland (Hastie, ut supra).

Cases dealing with an express appointment ad vitam aut culpam are those of Taylor (1767, Mor 13128) and Abercromby (1802, Mor 13154), in which it was held that employers were not entitled to appoint assistants to clerks holding expressly ad vitam aut culpam, even where there was no interference with the patrimonial rights of the latter. In 1896, Shennan said it might, however, be doubted how far these decisions would be followed at that date. In Rose (1853, 15 D 908) the opinion was expressed that the appointment of a procurator-fiscal of the J. P. Court, expressly bearing to be ad vitam aut culpam, could be nothing more than an appointment during pleasure.

In considering whether there has been culpa, the employer was entitled to inquire into and form his own judgment on the matter. "The Court will interfere only where there is irregularity, precipitation, and oppression in the course of the proceedings, and manifest failure to make out any serious case on the merits" (per LJC Hope in A B, 1844, 6 D 1238). The culpa had to be such as disqualified for the proper discharge of the duties of the office; and so, in the case of a schoolmaster, grave moral delinquencies were held to justify dismissal, although his ability and diligence in teaching were unimpeached (A B, 1825, 4 S 63; A B, ut supra). As to the proper remedy for one who alleged wrongous dismissal from an ad vitam aut culpam appointment, see Goldie (1868, 6 M 541).

== See also ==
- List of Latin phrases (A–E)
