= Berengaria =

Berengaria or Berenguela, the feminine form of the given name Berengar, may refer to:

- Berengaria of Barcelona (1116–1149), queen consort of Castile, León and Galicia
- Berengaria of Navarre (c.1165–1230), queen consort to Richard I of England
- Berengaria of Castile (1180–1246), briefly queen of Castile and León
- Berengaria of Portugal (c. 1195–1221), daughter of King Sancho I of Portugal, queen consort to Valdemar II of Denmark
- Berengaria of León (1204–1237), empress consort of John of Brienne, Latin Emperor of Constantinople

== See also ==
- Bérengère
- Berengarians, a religious sect that adhered to the views of Berengar of Tours
