= Amicus Plato, sed magis amica veritas =

Latin phrase

Amicus Plato, sed magis amica veritas is a Latin phrase, translating to "Plato is my friend, but truth is a better friend (literally: Plato is friend, but truth is more friend (to me than he is))." The maxim is often attributed to Aristotle, as a paraphrase of the Nicomachean Ethics 1096a11–15.

== Classical forms ==
The closest Platonic reference is the words of Socrates in Phaedo 91b–c:

παρεσκευασμένος δή, ἔφη, ὦ Σιμμία τε καὶ Κέβης, οὑτωσὶ ἔρχομαι ἐπὶ τὸν λόγον· ὑμεῖς μέντοι, ἂν ἐμοὶ πείθησθε, σμικρὸν φροντίσαντες Σωκράτους, τῆς δὲ ἀληθείας πολὺ μᾶλλον, ἐὰν μέν τι ὑμῖν δοκῶ ἀληθὲς λέγειν, συνομολογήσατε, εἰ δὲ μή, παντὶ λόγῳ ἀντιτείνετε, εὐλαβούμενοι ὅπως μὴ ἐγὼ ὑπὸ προθυμίας ἅμα ἐμαυτόν τε καὶ ὑμᾶς ἐξαπατήσας, ὥσπερ μέλιττα τὸ κέντρον ἐγκαταλιπὼν οἰχήσομαι.
"So," he said, "Simmias and Cebes, I approach the argument with my mind thus prepared. But you, if you do as I ask, will give little thought to Socrates and much more to the truth; and if you think what I say is true, agree to it, and if not, oppose me with every argument you can muster, that I may not in my eagerness deceive myself and you alike and go away, like a bee, leaving my sting sticking in you." (translated by Harold North Fowler)

The maxim Amicus Plato, sed magis amica veritas is often attributed to Aristotle, as a paraphrase of the Nicomachean Ethics 1096a11–15:

But perhaps it is desirable that we should examine the notion of a Universal Good, and review the difficulties that it involves, although such an inquiry goes against the grain because of our friendship for the authors of the Theory of Ideas. Still perhaps it would appear desirable, and indeed it would seem to be obligatory, especially for a philosopher, to sacrifice even one's closest personal ties in defense of the truth. Both are dear to us, yet 'tis our duty to prefer the truth.

Apparently contradicting Aristotle, Cicero states in Tusculanae Disputationes, I, xvii in reference to the Pythagoreans, that: "by Hercules, he would much rather err in company with Plato, than behold true things (vera sentire) with men of those opinions [Errare mehercule malo cum Platone...quam cum istis vera sentire.]" However, here, Cicero's suggestion is that Plato's philosophical investigation (of philosophy simpliciter) is preferable to any opinion, even if the opinion one beholds be "true." In this respect, Cicero's passage would be confirming, rather than contradicting, the message of Plato's Phaedo.

== Medieval forms ==
Berengar of Poitiers in a letter to the bishop of Mende around 1150, defended his earlier writings against Bernard of Clairvaux by reference to the saying, with Socrates replacing Plato:

Et tamen Aristoteles egregie ausus est dicere: 'Amicus est Socrates, sed magis amica est ueritas. Cum Socrate oportet sollicitum esse, sed magis cum ueritate.' Possum et simili uoce uti: 'amicus est Bernardus, sed magis amica est ueritas.'

Translation:

Yet Aristotle splendidly ventured to say: 'Socrates is my friend, but Truth is more my friend. One has to be careful concerning Socrates, but more concerning truth.' I can say something like that, too: 'Bernard is my friend, but Truth is more my friend.'

Another example is found in Roger Bacon, Opus Majus, Pars I, cap. v.

Nam Plato dicit: "Amicus est Socrates, magister meus, sed magis est amica veritas." Et Aristotelis dicit se magis velle consentire veritati, quam amicitiae Platonis, doctoris nostri. Haec ex Vita Aristotelis et primo Ethicorum, et libro Secretorum manifesta sunt.
For Plato says, "Socrates, my master, is my friend but a greater friend is truth." And Aristotle says that he prefers to be in accord with the truth, than with the friendship of our master, Plato. These things are clear from the Life of Aristotle and from the first book of Ethics and from the book of secrets.

Bacon's reference to the Nicomachean Ethics and a book of secrets is the pseudo-Aristotelian compilation, the Secretum Secretorum, translated into Latin from the Arabic in the twelfth or early thirteenth century. Henry Guerlac points out that the proverb appears in differing forms in a Life of Aristotle found in three distinct mediaeval manuscripts, two Greek and one Latin. Thomas Aquinas relies on the same source while proving the point in Sententia libri Ethicorum, Liber 1, Lectio 6, n. 4–5:

Quod autem oporteat veritatem praeferre amicis, ostendit hac ratione. Quia ei qui est magis amicus, magis est deferendum. Cum autem amicitiam habeamus ad ambo, scilicet ad veritatem et ad hominem, magis debemus veritatem amare quam hominem, quia hominem praecipue debemus amare propter veritatem et propter virtutem ut in VIII huius dicetur. Veritas autem est amicus superexcellens cui debetur reverentia honoris; est etiam veritas quiddam divinum, in Deo enim primo et principaliter invenitur. Et ideo concludit, quod sanctum est praehonorare veritatem hominibus amicis.

Dicit enim Andronicus Peripateticus, quod sanctitas est quae facit fideles et servantes ea quae ad Deum iusta. Haec etiam fuit sententia Platonis, qui reprobans opinionem Socratis magistri sui dixit quod oportet de veritate magis curare quam de aliquo alio; et alibi dicit: amicus quidem Socrates sed magis amica veritas; et in alio loco: de Socrate quidem parum est curandum, de veritate autem multum.

That truth should be preferred to friends he proves in this way. He is the greater friend for whom we ought to have the greater consideration. Although we should have friendship for both truth and our fellow man, we ought rather to love truth because we should love our fellow man especially on account of truth and virtue, as will be shown in the eighth book (1575-1577). Now truth is a most excellent friend of the sort to whom the homage of honor is due. Besides truth is a divine thing, for it is found first and chiefly in God. He concludes, therefore, that it is virtuous to honor truth above friends.

Andronicus, the peripatetic, says that piety makes men faithful to and observant of the things of God. Along the same line is the judgment of Plato who, in rejecting the opinion of his teacher Socrates, says a man ought to care more for truth than anything; and elsewhere says: "though Socrates is a friend, truth is a greater friend"; and in another place: "with Socrates concern yourself but little, but with truth much".

== Modern versions ==
Isaac Newton opened his 1661 Cambridge student notebook with the slogan reading: "Amicus Plato amicus Aristoteles magis amica veritas." Miguel de Cervantes popularized the redirection to Plato in Don Quixote, Part II, Chapter 51. Leonardo Tarán has traced the antecedents of Cervantes' adage in an eponymous 1984 paper. Logician Alfred Tarski excused his Platonism by amending the formula to Inimicus Plato sed magis inimica falsitas ("Plato is an enemy, but falsehood is a greater enemy"). In his novella Le Bal de Sceaux, Honoré de Balzac has the King of France Louis XVIII adapt the phrase as: Amicus Plato, sed magis amica Natio ("Plato is my friend, but the French Nation is a closer friend").
