= Berengar of Poitiers =

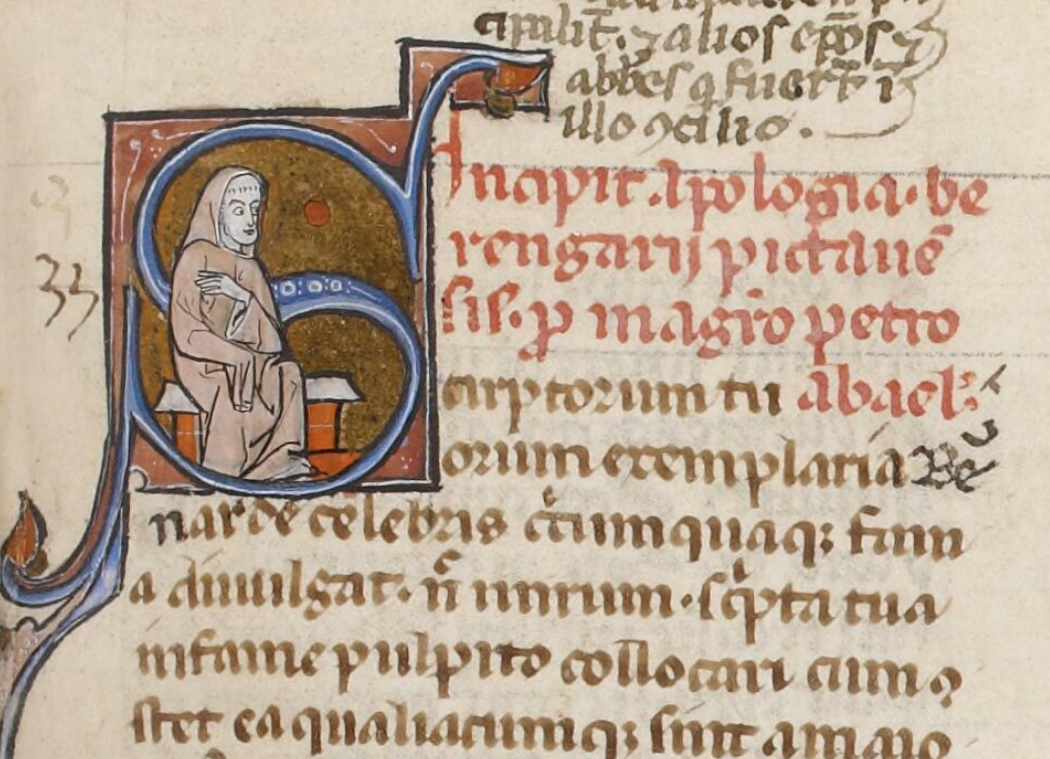
The decorated initial S of Berengar's Apologeticus in a manuscript of c. 1300

Berengar of Poitiers was a younger contemporary and zealous adherent of the philosopher Peter Abelard (d. 1142). Practically nothing is known of his life except what may be learned from his few brief writings. His byname, Pictauensis in Latin, indicates that he had some association with Poitou; probably he was born there. He was a member of the secular clergy.

Berengar's writings are found in five manuscripts. All of them were written after Abelard's condemnation at the Council of Sens in May 1140 or 1141. Three of them are extant: the Apologeticus, a defence of Abelard against Bernard of Clairvaux; the Epistola contra Carthusienses, a criticism of Abelard's Carthusian critics; and the Epistola ad episcopum Mimatensem, a letter requesting protection from the bishop of Mende. He wrote at least one lost work, De incarnatione Christi, a treatise against a heretical canon of Marseille named Benedict. The last is written from Cévennes, where he had sought an asylum after stirring up so much hostility that he feared for his safety. Nothing is known of his later life.

In his Apologeticus, probably written before Abelard's death on 21 April 1142, Berengar satirizes Bernard and the process against Abelard. He admits that Abelard has erred at points, but argues that Bernard is a hypocrite with no right to bring charges. Bernard has accused Abelard of contradicting the Church Fathers, but Bernard himself in his commentary on the Song of Songs has violated the rules of Horace's Ars poetica. If Bernard can be novel, why not Abelard? More substantially, Berengar also accuses Bernard of espousing the heretical Platonic view that souls originate in heaven and transmigrate to Earth. If Abelard had written something similar, Berengar avers, Bernard would certainly have put it on his list of errors.

In his letter to the Carthusians, Berengar berates the monks for hypocrisy in scriptural language, asking, "What good does it do, brethren, to go into the desert, and in the desert to have an Egyptian heart? What good does it do to avoid the frogs of Egypt, yet yourselves croak with obscene slanders?"

Berengar's letter to the bishop, William III, was composed towards 1150. In it, he retracts his criticism of Bernard, admitting that he would not stand by all that he had written since he was older and wiser. He nevertheless defends his writing by appealing to the example of Colotes, who criticized Plato, and of Aristotle:

Et tamen Aristoteles egregie ausus est dicere: 'Amicus est Socrates, sed magis amica est ueritas. Cum Socrate oportet sollicitum esse, sed magis cum ueritate.' Possum et simili uoce uti: 'amicus est Bernardus, sed magis amica est ueritas.'

Translation:

Yet Aristotle splendidly ventured to say: 'Socrates is my friend, but Truth is more my friend. One has to be careful concerning Socrates, but more concerning truth.' I can say something like that, too: 'Bernard is my friend, but Truth is more my friend.'

== Bibliography ==
- Luscombe, D. E. (1966). "Berengar, Defender of Peter Abelard". Recherches de théologie ancienne et médiévale. 33: 319–337. JSTOR 26187979.
- Nitzsch, F. (1908). "Berengar of Poitiers". In S. M. Jackson (ed.). The New Schaff–Herzog Encyclopedia of Religious Knowledge. Vol. 2. Funk and Wagnalls. p. 57.
- Thomson, R. M. (1980). "The Satirical Works of Berengar of Poitiers: An Edition with Introduction". Mediaeval Studies. 42: 89–138. doi:10.1484/J.MS.2.306256.
- Thomson, R. M.; Winterbottom, M., eds. (2020). For and Against Abelard: The Invective of Bernard of Clairvaux and Berengar of Poitiers. Boydell & Brewer.
- Winterbottom, Michael (2019). "The Manuscripts of Berengar of Poitiers". Mittellateinisches Jahrbuch: Internationale Zeitschrift für Mediävistik. 54 (1): 157–161.
