= Beringer =

Beringer may refer to:

- Karl-Friedrich Beringer (born 1948), German choral and orchestral conductor
- Beringer Vineyards
- Beringer's Lying Stones, limestone carved into the shape of various animals
- Joan Beringer (born 2006), French basketball player
- John Beringer, scientist

== See also ==
- Behringer, a German equipment company
