= Ad utrumque paratus =

Latin for "Ready for either alternative" or "Prepared for both"

Emblem of the Spanish Submarine Force

Ad utrumque paratus, sometimes shortened to ad utrumque, is Latin for "Ready for either alternative" or "Prepared for both" and is a sentence attributed to Virgil. It is used as a motto on the seal of Lund University. It is also used as the motto of the Spanish Navy Submarine force. The motto is also inscribed at the entrance of the Submarine School building in Cartagena's Naval Station, Murcia, Spain. The beginning (Ad utrumque) was also used as personal motto by the Spanish Monarchs in the 17th century.

The French commune Monistrol-sur-Loire uses the same sentence on its escutcheon but the motif is a sword and a crosier. This suggests that utrumque ("both"), may in that case refer to fighting and preaching.

AD UTRUMQUE PARATUS is the motto of the United States Marine Corps' III Marine Expeditionary Force Special Operations Training Group (SOTG). III SOTG's unit insignia consists of the Marine Raider stiletto on a red escutcheon. The unit's name and motto appear on a yellow border surrounding the escutcheon. As a unit devoted to the study and training of special operations, the motto suggests preparation for both the book and the sword. However, the history alluded to by the Raider stiletto and the conventional nature of the Marine Corps suggest a preparedness for both conventional and unconventional warfare. SOTG trains units in missions ranging from Non-combatant Evacuation Operation and Tactical Recovery of Aircraft and Personnel to sniping and ship boarding.

In the emblem of the municipality in Walvis Bay in Namibia we find a modification of the motto as "In utrumque paratus".
