= Bérengère Fromy =

French physiologist

Personal details
- Occupation: Physiologist

Bérengère Fromy is a French researcher in physiology. A research director at the French National Centre for Scientific Research (CNRS), she works at the Tissue Biology and Therapeutic Engineering Laboratory at the Claude-Bernard Lyon 1 University.

Such areas of her studies include skin aging and aging in women.

== Awards and distinctions ==
- CNRS Bronze Medal (2013)
- Prix Charles Grupper (2013)
