= Between a rock and a hard place =

Between a rock and a hard place, or simply a rock and a hard place, may refer to:

== Literature ==
- A Rock and a Hard Place, a 1988 Vietnam War novel by David Sherman
- A Rock and a Hard Place: One Boy's Triumphant Story, a 1993 memoir supposedly by Anthony Godby Johnson, considered to be a literary hoax
- Between a Rock and a Hard Place (book), a 2004 autobiography by Aron Ralston

== Music ==
- Between a Rock and a Hard Place (Australian Crawl album), 1985
- Between a Rock and a Hard Place (Artifacts album), 1994
- A Rock and a Hard Place, a song by Sisters of Mercy from their 1985 album First and Last and Always
- "Rock and a Hard Place" (Rolling Stones song), a 1989 single by the Rolling Stones
- "(Between a) Rock and a Hard Place", a song by Cutting Crew from their 1989 album The Scattering
- "Rock and a Hard Place" (Bailey Zimmerman song), a 2022 song by Bailey Zimmerman

== Film and television ==
- A Rock and a Hard Place (film), a Canadian documentary film
- Rock and a Hard Place (film), a documentary film produced by and featuring Dwayne Johnson
- "Between a Rock and a Hard Place" (The Detectives), a 1995 episode
- Rock and a Hard Place (Big Love), an episode of the American drama television series Big Love
- "A Rock and a Hard Place", a 1997 episode of Hercules: The Legendary Journeys
- "Between a Rock and a Hard Place", a 2009 episode of Make It or Break It
- "Rock and a Hard Place", a 2013 episode of Supernatural
- "Rock and Hard Place", a 2022 episode of Better Call Saul
- "A Rock and a Hard Place", a 1980 episode of the Incredible Hulk live-action series with Bill Bixby and Lou Ferrigno

== See also ==
- Between a Rock and a Heart Place, a 2010 autobiography by Pat Benatar
- Between Iraq and a Hard Place, a 2003 album by the Capitol Steps
- Rock in a Hard Place, a 1982 album by Aerosmith
- Between Scylla and Charybdis, an idiom with a similar meaning
