= Animus in consulendo liber =

Motto of NATO

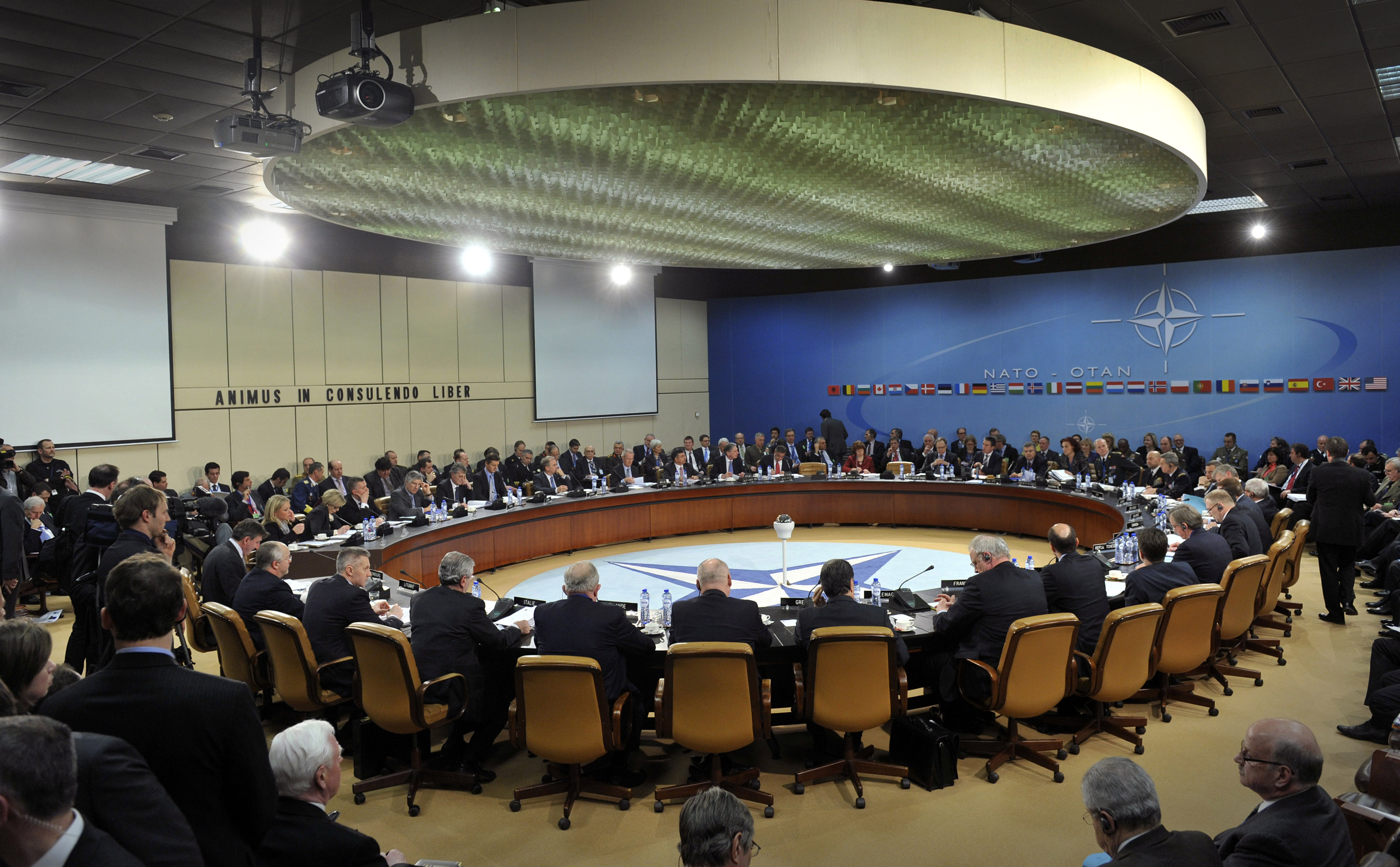
Motto on the left wall at NATO headquarters in Brussels, 2013

Animus in consulendo liber (Latin: "A mind unfettered in deliberation") is the motto of the North Atlantic Treaty Organization (NATO). The phrase is from The Conspiracy of Catiline (52.21) by the Roman historian Sallust, and was translated by Charles Anthon as "a mind unfettered in deliberation".

The motto was chosen by the dean of the NATO Council, André de Staercke, to reflect the spirit of consultation envisioned by the then-Secretary General of NATO Paul-Henri Spaak. De Staercke borrowed the quote when he recalled his visit to the Palace of the Chief Magistrate in San Gimignano, where "animus in consulendo liber" was engraved on the Magistrate's seat. The motto is displayed on the wall of the main council room at NATO headquarters in Brussels, behind the chairman's seat.

The motto's original context by Sallust, who cites Cato the Younger's address to the Roman Senate, is: "But there were other qualities which made them [our forefathers] great, which we do not possess at all: efficiency at home, a just rule abroad, in counsel an independent spirit free from guilt or passion".
