= Berenguer d'Anoia =

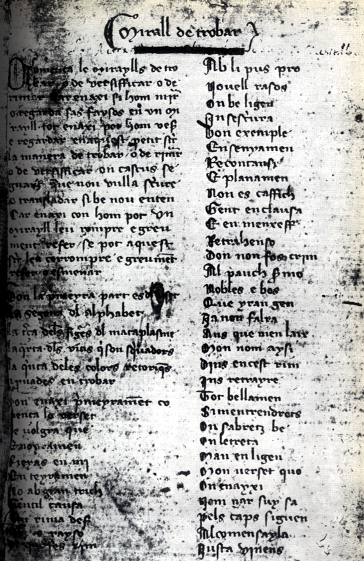
Opening page of his Mirall de trobar

Berenguer d'Anoia or de Noya (fl. c. 1300) was a Catalan troubadour from the Kingdom of Majorca. He wrote the Mirall de trobar, an Occitan poetic, grammatical, and rhetorical treatise in the tradition of the Razos de trobar of Raimon Vidal and the Regles de trobar of Jofre de Foixà, a genre always popular in Catalan country.

Berenguer's parents were noble Catalans, originally from the village of Sant Sadurní d'Anoia, who settled at Inca in Majorca following its conquest by James the Conqueror. This information concerning his family and origins is found hidden in his own writings in the form of an acrostic which states:

Berenger d'Anoia·m dits hom; mon payre fo asats prom. En Incha fo mos naximens, e a Noia naschron mos parens.	Berenguer d'Anoia I am called; my father was a nobleman. In Inca was I born, and in Anoia were born my parents.

The Mirall commences with a prologue explaining its division into four chapters that study rhetorical forms and major poetic errors. It begins thus: Comença la miraylls de trobar o de versificar o de rimar. Car si hom mira o regarda sas fausas en un mirall... Everything is illustrated with examples drawn from the compositions of previous troubadours, but not always in the correct form. Berenguer himself does not have any work to his own name, though some otherwise unattributable fragments from his treatise are assumed to be his work. The following short section is taken from his illustration of the religious alba:

Gaita, be gardatz
que no us sia amblatz
lo castell que tan beyl
vos a Deus comanatz,
car si es noveyl
non es aycell
qui mantz n'a enganatz.
No us fisetz en l'enemich
qui per plazer vos destrich,
ans fayts gens queix vostra gaita

The Institut Berenguer d’Anoia, founded in Inca in 1970, was named after the troubadour.

== Sources ==
- Els trobadors. Trobadors catalans. Berenguer d'Anoia (cap a 1300).
- Incipitario di Berenguer d’Anoia.
- Institut Berenguer d’Anoia.
