= Argumentum ad captandum =

Specious argument: "captivate the masses"

In rhetoric, an argumentum ad captandum, "for capturing" the gullibility of the naïve among the listeners or readers, is an unsound, specious argument designed to appeal to the emotions rather than to the mind. It is used to describe "claptrap or meretricious attempts to catch popular favor or applause."

The longer form of the term is ad captandum vulgus (Latin, "to ensnare the vulgar" or "to captivate the masses"); the shorter and longer versions of the phrase are synonymous. The word "vulgus" in Latin meant the common people, the multitude; it was also sometimes used contemptuously to imply a rabble or a mob.

The ad captandum approach is commonly seen in political speech, advertising, and popular entertainment. The classic example of something ad captandum vulgus was the "bread and circuses" by which the Roman emperors maintained the support of the people of Rome.

== See also ==
- Appeal to emotion
- Argumentum ad populum
- Captatio benevolentiae
- For the children (politics)
- Glittering generality
- If-by-whiskey
- Loaded language
- No true Scotsman
