= Argentum album =

Argentum album (Latin for "white money" or "silver coin"), mentioned in Domesday, signifies bullion, or silver uncoined. In those ancient days, such passed as money from one to another in payment.

Sumitur pro ipso hoc metallo pensili non signato. Spelm.
