= Berenguer Ramon =

Berenguer Ramon or Berengar Raymond might refer to:

- Berenguer Ramon I, Count of Barcelona "The Hunchback", (1005–1035)
- Berenguer Ramon II, Count of Barcelona "The Fratricide", (1050s–1090s)
- Berenguer Ramon, Count of Provence (1115–1144)

== See also ==
- Ramon Berenguer (disambiguation)
