= Ab initio =

Latin term meaning "from the beginning"

Ab initio (/ˌæb ɪˈnɪʃioʊ/ AB in-ISH-ee-oh) is a Latin term meaning "from the beginning" and is derived from the Latin ab ("from") + initio, ablative singular of initium ("beginning").

== Etymology ==
Ab initio was first used in c. 1600, from Latin, literally "from the beginning", from ablative case of initium "entrance", "beginning", related to verb inire "to go into", "enter upon", "begin".

== Uses ==
Ab initio (abbreviation: ab init.) is used in several contexts, including the following:

=== Law ===
In law, ab initio refers to something being the case from the start or from the instant of the act rather than from when the court declared it so. For instance, the term "void ab initio" means "to be treated as invalid from the outset." E.g., in many jurisdictions, if a person signs a contract under duress, that contract is treated as being "void ab initio".

Typically, documents or acts which are void ab initio cannot be fixed and if a jurisdiction, a document, or an act is so declared at law to be void ab initio, the parties are returned to their respective positions that they were at the beginning of the event.

"Void ab initio" is often contrasted with "voidable" in futuro, such documents which become void only as of the date of a certain event or of the judicial declaration to that effect. For example, termination of a contract only operates in futuro.

An insurer facing a claim from an insured who had deceived the insurer on a material fact would claim that the insurance contract was void ab initio; it was null and void from the beginning and that since there was no legally enforceable contract, the insurer ought not to have to pay.

=== Science and engineering ===
In general, a calculation is said to be ab initio (or "from first principles") if it relies on basic and established laws of nature without additional assumptions or special models.

For example, an ab initio calculation of the properties of liquid water might start with the properties of the constituent hydrogen and oxygen atoms and the laws of electrostatics and quantum mechanics. From these basics, the properties of isolated individual water molecules would be derived, followed by computations of the interactions of larger and larger groups of water molecules, until the bulk properties of water had been determined. This in contrast to an approach that uses approximations (which could allow for easier computations) that have no direct link to these first principles.

- Documentation of a process is said to be ab initio (or from scratch, or from the ground up) if the documentation shows how to set up and complete the process from basic materials (to which a competent practitioner is expected to have access) without prior special preparation.
- In nuclear physics, the mass-energy of different nuclei can be determined with ab initio methods by solving the Schrödinger equation over all particles.
- Likewise in chemistry, this refers to ab initio quantum chemistry methods.
- In biophysics, this refers to a method for the prediction of protein structures in protein folding.
- In bioinformatics, ab initio (or de novo) methods make predictions about biological features using only a computational model without extrinsic comparison to existing data.

=== Other uses ===
- In aviation, the term is used to refer to the first stage of flight training.
- In learning a subject or foreign language, ab initio refers to study without previous knowledge or assumptions.
- In literature, a story told ab initio is told from the beginning; Horace called this method ab ovo ('from the egg'). This is as opposed to in medias res (in the middle of the story).

== See also ==
- A priori
- Abatement ab initio
- Ab ovo
- Ad fontes
- List of legal Latin terms
