= Ramon Berenguer =

Ramon Berenguer or Raymond Berengar may refer to:

- Ramon Berenguer I, Count of Barcelona (1023–1076), called "the Old"
- Ramon Berenguer II, Count of Barcelona (1053/54–1082), called "the Towhead"
- Ramon Berenguer III, Count of Barcelona (1082–1131), called "the Great"; also Ramon Berenguer I, Count of Provence
- Ramon Berenguer IV, Count of Barcelona (c. 1114–1162), called "the Holy"
- Ramon Berenguer II, Count of Provence (c. 1135–1166)
- Ramon Berenguer III, Count of Provence (c. 1158–1181)
- Ramon Berenguer IV, Count of Provence (1198–1245)
- Raymond Berengar of Andria (between 1279 and 1282–1307)
- Raymond Berengar (Grand Master of the Knights Hospitaller) (died 1374)

== See also ==
- Berenguer Ramon (disambiguation)
