= Amittere legem terrae =

Amittere legem terrae (literally, "to lose the law of the land") is a Latin phrase used in law, signifying the forfeiture of the right of swearing in any court or cause, or to become infamous. Historically, this has been the punishment of champions overcome, or yielding in the combat; of jurors found guilty in a writ of attaint; and of persons outlawed.
