= In medias res =

Narrative technique

In mediās rēs (Classical Latin: [ɪn ˈmɛdɪ.aːs ˈreːs], lit. 'into the middle of things') is the plot device of starting a narrative in the chronological middle of the plot or conflict, rather than at the chronological beginning (cf. ab ovo, ab initio). Often, exposition is initially bypassed, instead filled in later through dialogue, flashbacks, or description of past events. For example, Hamlet begins after the death of Hamlet's father, which is later discovered to have been a murder. Characters make reference to King Hamlet's death without the plot's first establishment of this fact. Since Hamlet's mental state and desire for revenge are more important than the motivation, Shakespeare begins the play in medias res to bypass superfluous exposition.

Works that employ in medias res often later use nonlinear narrative structure to fill in the backstory. In Homer's Odyssey, the reader first learns about Odysseus's journey when he is held captive on Ogygia, Calypso's island. The reader then finds out, in Books IX through XII, that the greater part of Odysseus's journey precedes that moment in the narrative. In Homer's Iliad there are fewer flashbacks, although it opens in the thick of the Trojan War.

== First use of the phrase ==
The Roman lyric poet and satirist Horace (65–8 BC) first used the terms ab ovo ("from the egg") and in mediās rēs ("into the middle of things") in his Ars Poetica ("Poetic Arts", c. 13 BC), wherein lines 147–149 describe the ideal epic poet:

Nor does he begin the Trojan War from the egg, but always he hurries to the action, and snatches the listener into the middle of things ...

The word "egg" reference is to the mythological origin of the Trojan War in the birth of Helen and Clytemnestra from the double egg laid by Leda following her seduction by Zeus in the guise of a swan. Compare the Iliad, which begins nine years after the start of the Trojan War, rather than at its beginning.

== Literary history ==
With likely origins in oral tradition, the narrative technique of beginning a story in medias res is a stylistic convention of epic poetry, the exemplars in Western literature being the Iliad and the Odyssey (both 7th century BC), by Homer. Likewise, the Mahābhārata (c. 8th century BC – c. 4th century AD) opens in medias res.

The classical-era poet Virgil (Publius Vergilius Maro, 70–19 BC) continued this literary narrative technique in the Aeneid. Later works starting in medias res include the story "The Three Apples" from the One Thousand and One Nights (c. 9th century), the Italian Divine Comedy (1320) by Dante Alighieri, the German Nibelungenlied (12th century), the Spanish Cantar de Mio Cid (c. 14th century), the Portuguese The Lusiads (1572) by Luís de Camões, Jerusalem Delivered (1581) by Torquato Tasso, Paradise Lost (1667) by John Milton, and generally in Modernist literature.

Modern novelists using in medias res with flashbacks include William Faulkner and Toni Morrison.

Edgar Allan Poe's "The Tell-Tale Heart" is written in medias res.

Some biographers start with a turning point in the subject's life. For example, David McCullough's Truman begins with his World War I experience.

== Cinematic history ==
It is typical for film noir to begin in medias res; for example, a private detective will enter the plot already in progress. Crossfire (1947) opens with the murder of Joseph Samuels. As the police investigate the crime, the story behind the murder is told via flashbacks. Dead Reckoning (1947) opens with Humphrey Bogart as Rip Murdock on the run and attempting to hide in a Catholic church. Inside, the backstory is told in flashback as Murdock explains his situation to a priest.

The technique has been used across genres, including dramas such as Through a Glass Darkly (1961), 8½ (1963), Raging Bull (1980), and City of God (2002); crime thrillers such as No Way Out (1987), Grievous Bodily Harm (1988), The Usual Suspects (1995), and Kill Bill Volume 2 (2004); horror films such as Firestarter (1984); action films such as many in the James Bond franchise; and comedies such as Dr. Strangelove (1964). Some have argued that Star Wars takes advantage of this technique because its first-released film, A New Hope, is the fourth episode of a nine-part epic.

Superhero films with a satirical edge such as Deadpool (2016) and Birds of Prey (2020) have utilized in medias res to frame their stories.

Animated films such as Grave of the Fireflies (1988), The Emperor's New Groove (2000), Hoodwinked! (2005), Happily N'Ever After (2006), Megamind (2010), and The Mitchells vs. the Machines (2021) have opening scenes in medias res, with a brief but significant scene that foreshadows the events that occurred earlier. This scene is then seen again afterwards (although in a different way than how it was shown at the beginning).

Many war films, such as The Thin Red Line (1998), also begin in medias res, with the protagonists already actively in combat and no prior domestic scenes leading up to the film's events.

== See also ==
- Cold open
- Flashforward
- Reverse chronology
