= Ars Poetica (Horace) =

C. 19 BC poem by Horace

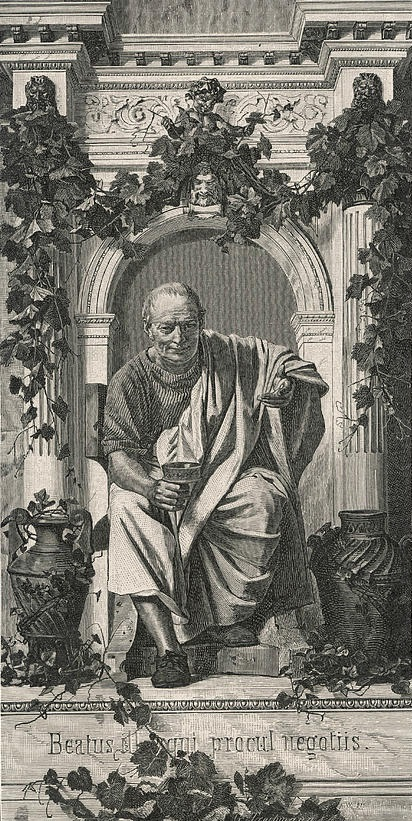
The art of poetry

"Ars Poetica", or "The Art of Poetry", sometimes referred to as the "Epistula ad Pisones", or "Epistle to the Pisos", is a Latin poem written by Horace c. 19 BC, in which he advises poets on the art of writing poetry and drama. The Ars Poetica has "exercised a great influence in later ages on European literature, notably on French drama", and has inspired poets and authors since it was written. Although it has been well-known since the Middle Ages, it has been used in literary criticism since the Renaissance.

== Background ==
The poem was written in hexameter verse as an Epistle (or Letter) to Lucius Calpurnius Piso (the Roman senator and consul) and his two sons, and is sometimes referred to as the Epistula ad Pisones, or "Epistle to the Pisos". The first mention of its name as the "Ars Poetica" was c. 95 by the classical literary critic Quintilian in his Institutio Oratoria, and since then it has been known by that name. The translations of the original epistle are typically in the form of prose.

"Written, like Horace's other epistles of this period, in a loose conversational frame, Ars Poetica consists of 476 lines containing nearly 30 maxims for young poets." But Ars Poetica is not a systematic treatise of theory, and it wasn't intended to be. It is an inviting and lively poetic letter, composed for friends who appreciate poetic literature.

Horace approaches poetry from a practical standpoint—as a craft, or ars—rather than the theoretical approach of his predecessors, philosophers Aristotle and Plato. He also holds the poet in high regard, as opposed, for instance, to Plato, who distrusts mimesis and who has philosopher Socrates say in Book 10 of the Republic that he would banish poets from the ideal state.

== Summary ==
The following is a brief outline of the main subjects of the work:

(a) A poem demands unity, to be secured by harmony and proportion, as well as a wise choice of subject and good diction. Meter and style must be appropriate to theme and to character. A good model will always be found in Homer (ll, 1–152).

(b) Dramatic poetry calls for special care – as to character drawing, propriety of representation, length of a play, number of actors, use of the chorus and its music, special features for the satyric type, verse-forms, and employment of Greek models (ll. 153–294).

(c) A poet's qualifications include common sense, knowledge of character, adherence to high ideals, combination of the dulce with the utile, intellectual superiority, appreciation of the noble history and lofty mission of poetry, and above all a willingness to listen to and profit by impartial criticism (ll. 295–476).

(For a more detailed summary of Horace's Ars Poetica, see the article on Horace's Epistles – Epistle II.3).

== Literary phrases ==
According to Howatson, many of the phrases used by Horace in Ars Poetica "have passed into common literary parlance." Four quotations in particular associated with the work are:

- "in medias res (l. 148)", or "into the middle of things". This describes a narrative technique of starting the story from its middle point. According to Horace, this entices the audience into the plot by making everyone curious about the characters' previous paths and their future destinies. The technique appeared frequently in ancient epics, and remains popular in modern narratives.
- "ab ovo (l. 147)", or "from the beginning". As Homer did not initiate his epics about the Trojan War from the conception (thus, the egg – "ovo" in Latin) of Helen, poets and other story tellers should do something likewise: in other words, starting a story from its commencement will bore and fatigue audiences that may not be interested in a plot that is tediously inclusive. For another explanation of this mention of an egg, see Leda (mythology).
- "quandoque bonus dormitat Homerus (l. 359)" or "sometimes even good Homer nods off". Today this expression is used to indicate that 1. even the most skilled poet can make continuity errors and 2. long works, usually epics (such as the Iliad or the Odyssey), may have their faults without that detracting significantly from their general quality. In context, however, Horace even censures Homer for such lapses. It reads "et idem / indignor quandoque bonus dormitat Homerus" (I even castigate the good Homer for the same [fault of technical errors] whenever he nods off).
- "ut pictura poesis (l. 361)", or "as is painting so is poetry", by which Horace meant that poetry, in its widest sense meaning "imaginative texts", merits the same careful interpretation that was in his day reserved for painting.

(The latter two phrases occur one after the other near the end of the poem.)

- "Desinit in piscem (l. 4)," or "it ends with the tail of a fish," is used by Horace to emphasize that literary works must be composed with unity to fulfill their promises to the reader. He warns against creating works that resemble mythological figures with a beautiful woman's head and breast but ending in a fish tail instead of legs, indicating a lack of cohesion.

== Key concepts ==
The work is also known for its discussion of the principle of decorum (the use of appropriate vocabulary and diction in each style of writing; l.81–106) and for Horace's criticisms of purple prose (purpureus pannus, l.15–16), a term coined by him to mean the use of flowery language. This principle is considered a core component of Horatian poetics as it principally aimed to achieve verisimilitude in artistic representation, guiding everything from the choice of genre to diction, dramatic characterization, meter, poetic invention, and the intended effect. Some cited that decorum enforces subordination such as of parts to whole, woman to man, desire to reason, and individual to state.

In line 191, Horace warns against deus ex machina, the practice of resolving a convoluted plot by having an Olympian god appear and set things right. Horace writes "Nec deus intersit, nisi dignus vindice nodus": "That a god not intervene, unless a knot show up that be worthy of such an untangler".

Perhaps it can even be said that the quotability of Horace's Ars Poetica is what has given it a distinguished place in literary criticism. The Norton Anthology of Theory and Criticism says:

It would be impossible to overestimate the importance of Horace's Ars Poetica (Art of Poetry) for the subsequent history of literary criticism. Since its composition in the first century BCE, this epigrammatic and sometimes enigmatic critical poem has exerted an almost continual influence over poets and literary critics alike – perhaps because its dicta, phrased in verse form, are so eminently quotable. Horace's injunction that poetry should both "instruct and delight" has been repeated so often that it has come to be known as the Horatian platitude.

The Horatian platitude is usually given as "instruct and delight", but sometimes as "instruct or delight". The first reading implies that all literature must be instructive. A related ambiguity is that "instruct" might be better translated as "help", "advise", or "warn". Horace repeats this maxim in different wordings: "Aut prodesse uolunt aut delectare poetae aut simul et iucunda et idonea dicere uitae" ("The poet wishes to benefit or please, or to be pleasant and helpful at the same time"), "miscuit utile dulci" ("a mix of useful and sweet"), and "delectando pariterque monendo" ("delighting and advising").

== Translations ==
Ars Poetica was first translated into French in 1541 by Jacques Pelletier du Mans.

The Ars Poetica was first translated into English in 1566 by Thomas Drant. A translation by Ben Jonson was published posthumously in 1640.

== See also ==
- Epistles of Horace
