= Quaestiones quaedam philosophicae =

Quaestiones quaedam philosophicae (Certain philosophical questions) is the name given to a set of notes that Isaac Newton kept for himself during his earlier years in Cambridge. They concern questions in the natural philosophy of the day that interested him. Apart from the light it throws on the formation of his own agenda for research, the major interest in these notes is the documentation of the unaided development of the scientific method in the mind of Newton, whereby every question is put to experimental test.

== Introduction ==
The Quaestiones are contained in an octavo notebook, currently in the Cambridge University Library, which was Newton's basic notebook in which he set down in 1661 his readings in the required curriculum in Cambridge and his later readings in mechanical philosophy. He entered notes from both ends. The initial notes, in Greek, were on Aristotle's logic at one end and his ethics, at the other.

But following this, he drew a line across the page, below which appears his first notes on the new natural philosophy of his day – a compendium of limits on the radii of stars as determined by Galileo and Auzout. At the other end of the book, he interrupted his notes on Aristotle with two pages of notes on Descartes's metaphysics.

Following this, the central approximately hundred pages of this notebook is entitled Questiones quadem Philosophcae [sic], and a later motto over the title Amicus Plato amicus Aristotle magis amica veritas ('Plato is my friend, Aristotle is my friend, but my best friend is truth').

== Dating ==
The start of Quaestiones is definitely after 8 July 1661, the date on which Newton arrived at Trinity College. It is also definitely before 9 December 1664, on which day (and the following) he made notes of his observations of a comet. Other datings of the first entries are based on his handwriting—which changed drastically between the early notes of 1661 and later notes which can be dated independently to 1665. The transitional handwriting which characterizes the early parts of Quaestiones can only be independently dated to roughly 1664. This was written during a period when Newton was actively developing the notion of calculus, but mathematics made no real appearance in this notebook.

== Contents ==
The Quaestiones contains notes from Newton's thorough reading of Descartes, Walter Charlton's translation of Gassendi into English, Galileo Galilei's Dialogue Concerning the Two Chief World Systems, Robert Boyle, Thomas Hobbes, Kenelm Digby, Joseph Glanvill and Henry More, and others. These were set down under 45 section headings which he used to organize his readings. They began with the nature of matter, place, time and motion and went on to the organization of the universe. This was followed by what would be classed today as properties of condensed matter, for example, rarity, fluidity, hardness etc. These were followed by questions on violent motion, light, colour, vision, and other sensations. The last part contains miscellaneous topics which presumably occurred to him later during his readings: "Of God", "Of [the] Creation", "Of [the] soule" and "Of Sleepe and Dreams &c". Some headings were followed by vast entries, which had to be continued elsewhere; others were blank. The earlier essays were organized into questions and outlines of possible experiments which roughly fit into modern notions of science, not the broader ancient notion of philosophy.

=== Gravity ===
The topic of gravity was not dealt with in a single section, showing that his understanding of the matter was still far from well developed. In a section on perpetual motion machines (folio 121) he wrote

Whether [the] rays of gravity may be stopped by reflecting or refracting [them], if so a perpetual motion may be made one of these ways.

Elsewhere, in his notes on Kepler's laws of planetary motion that he read about in the book Astronomiae carolina by Thomas Streete, he reached the conclusion that gravity must not merely act on the surfaces of bodies but on their interiors.

=== On violent motion ===
In Aristotelian physics, bodies are subject to either natural motion, such as when a heavy body falls, or violent motion such as when a heavy body is thrown up. Although this essay was written following his reading of Descartes and Galileo, by its title it shows that Newton did not reject pre-Galilean mechanics tout court.

=== Nature of light ===
Descartes believed that he was the first to obtain the law of refraction of light and paid great attention to it as well as to the well-known classical law of reflection. Descartes hypothesized that light is pressure, transmitted instantaneously through a transparent medium. Gassendi, on the contrary, held that light is a stream of tiny particles traveling with immense speed. Newton questioned Descartes's theory in many ways; in folio 103 he wrote—

Light cannot be pressure for we should see in the night as well or better in the day we should be a bright light above us because we are pressed downwards ... there could be no refraction since same matter cannot press 2 ways. a little body interposed could not hinder us from seeing pressure could not render shapes so distinct. sun could not be quite eclipsed Moone & planets would shine like suns. When a fire or candle is extinguished we looking another way should see a light.

=== Nature of colour ===
The then-current theory of color held that white light was elementary and that colors arose from mixtures of light and dark. Newton criticised this theory by noting that in that case a printed page, with its juxtaposition of light and dark, would look colored. In folio 122 he recorded for the first time his notion that white light is heterogeneous and colors arise, not through the modification of a homogeneous white light, but from the separation of this mixture into its components. Newton also mentions Hooke's theory of color, including his idea that it is a wave. Newton dismisses this theory with the remark that then light should bend around edges of objects as sounds do.

=== Of atoms ===
Newton seems to have come across the idea of atomism through his knowledge of Gassendi gained by reading Charleton's Physiologia. He argued against continua and asserted the need for atoms. His acceptance of the corpuscular theory of light may have been affected by this.

== See also ==
- Aristotelian physics, Galileo and Descartes
- Isaac Newton, the Philosophiae Naturalis Principia Mathematica and Opticks
