= Balbi =

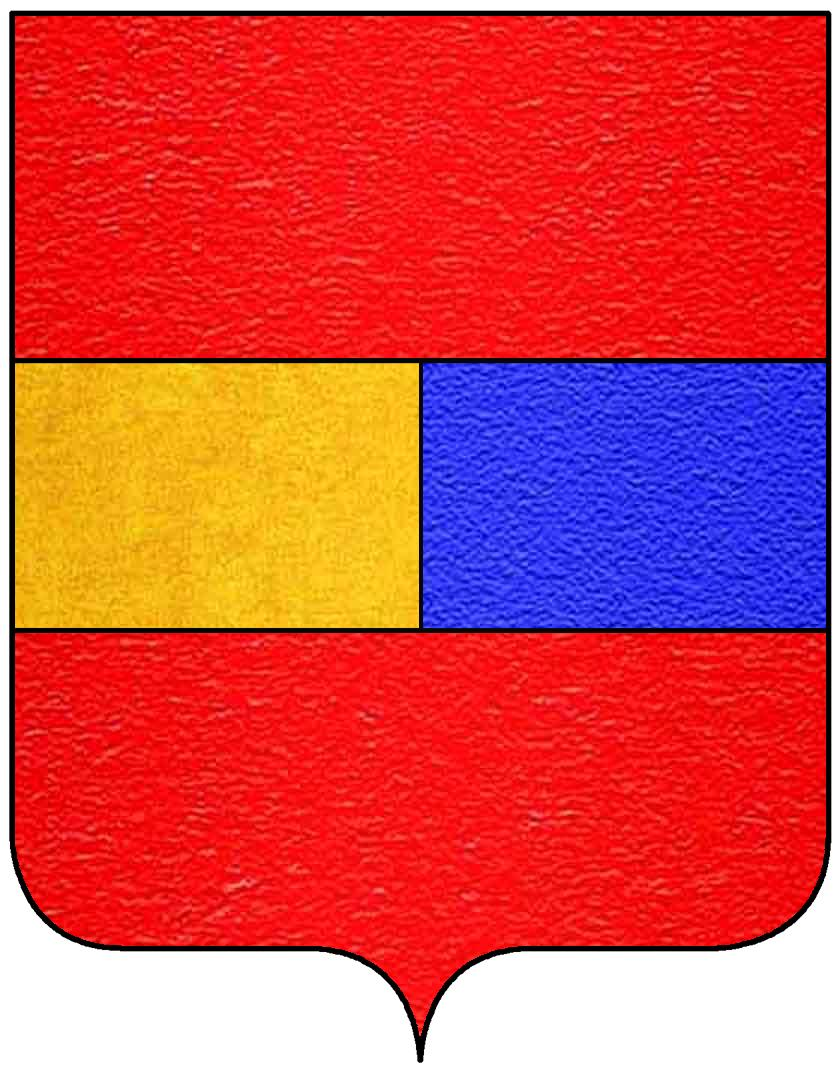
Coat of arms of the Balbi family of Venice

Balbi (Known also as Balbis, Balby, Balbus, Valbi or Valvis) is the surname of the ancient noble Roman Family of Balbi where after the fall of the Western part of the Roman Empire and during the Middle Ages expanded in Venice, Genoa, Constantinople, Greece, Spain, Germany, Malta and other places. Balbi is one of the few surnames that has remained unchanged over the centuries and was one of the most famous prominent and wealthy families in Italy. Members of the Balbi family held high rank positions and noble titles such as Patrician, Senators, Dukes, Doge, Barons, Marchese, Lords e.t.c in the Maritime Republics of Venice and Genoa, the Eastern Roman and Holy Roman Empire of the German Nation, engaged in piracy, maritime trade, stock market and war activities where acquired wealth and power. Later in history many Balbi's participated in historical events such as revolutions, battles or served as Generals, Members of Parliament and Prime Ministers in many countries.

== Famous Balbis ==
=== Roman Republic ===
- Marcus Acilius Balbus Roman Consul in 150 B.C
- Man. Acilius Balbus Roman Consul in 114 B.C.
- Lucius Lucilius Balbus, fl. 1st century BCE, Roman jurist
- Quintus Antonius Balbus, (d. 82 BCE) praetor of Sardinia during Sulla's civil war
- Titus Ampius Balbus, figure of the Civil Wars, 1st century BCE
- Marcus Atius Balbus (Caesar Augustus' grandfather)
- Publius Cornelius Balbus, fl. 1st century BCE, ally of Pompey
- Lucius Cornelius Balbus (consul 40 BC), fl. 1st century BCE, Roman politician and businessman
- Lucius Cornelius Balbus (proconsul), fl. 1st century BCE, Roman Noble of Gades

=== Imperial Rome ===
- C. Naevius Balbus Roman military leader
- Junius Balbus, Consular, husband of Metia Faustina, the daughter of the elder Gordian
- C. Valerius Flaccus Setinus Balbus
- Domilius Balbus wealthy Praetorian

=== Other ===
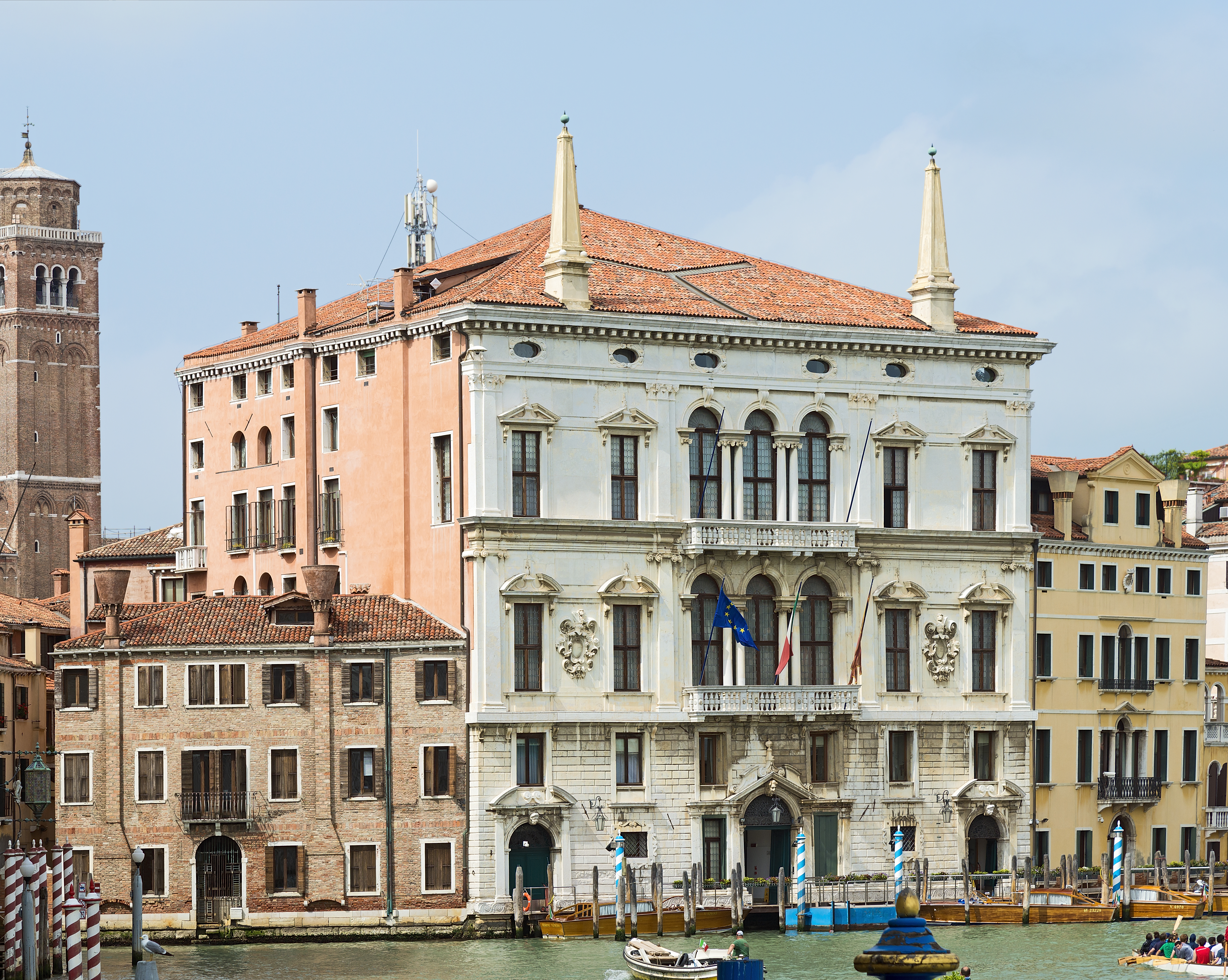
Palazzo Balbi on Grand Canal

- Steve Balbi bass guitarist Noiseworks- Australian Band
- John of Genoa Catholic priest in the early Renaissance period writer of "Catholicon" a comprehensive Latin dictionary in 1460
- Francisco Balbi di Correggio (1505–1589), Italian arquebusier. He was born in the town of Correggio in the modern Italian province of Emilia-Romagna. Francisco was a poet and historian who wrote in Italian and Spanish. He served in the military and fought in the Siege of Malta in 1565. He wrote the only first hand history of that famous battle. His experience in battle and other events during his military career were published in his memoir "The Siege of Malta 1565".
- Ludovico Balbi (c.1545-1604), Venetian singer-composer and friar. Singer at St. Marco, Venice from 1570 to 1578. Throughout his life, Balbi was appointed maestro di cappella of St. Maria Gloriosa del Frari, of the Cappella Antoniana in Padua and the Treviso Cathedral. Received an honorary degree as maestro dell'ordine, denoting particular skill exercised over a long period.
- Luigi Balbi, Venetian composer, organist, singer and friar. Nephew of Ludovico Balbi. Sang in the choir of St. Marco in Venice and later the Cappella del Santo at the basilica of St. Antonio, Padua. Appointed maestro di cappella at the Church of the Carit in Venice.
- Bartolomeo Balbi (1542–1593): Genoese consul in Antwerp, married to Lucrezia Santvoort. He died in Antwerp, and is buried in St-James.
- Giovan Battista Balbi (fl. 1636–1657), 17th-century choreographer, dancer, and stage designer. He was involved with Venetian opera from its inception and played an important role in the introduction of Venetian opera to northern Europe.
- Lorenzo Balbi (c.1680–1740), Italian composer
- Ignacio Balbi (1720–1775), An 18th-century composer who performed primarily in Milan.
- Giovanni Battista Balbis (1765–1831), botanist, teacher of Antoine Risso
- Adrian Balbi (1782–1848), Italian geographer
- Raul Balbi, Argentine world boxing champion
- Domenico Balbi painter, designer and engraver
- Gio Francesco Balbi I Senator in Genoa and Procurator
- Gerolamo Balbi Senator in Genoa
- Francesco Maria Balbi, Marchese
- Marco Balbi, Bailo of Corfu
- Giovanni Balbi, Bailo of Corfu
- Giulio Balbi, Bailo of Corfu
- Pietro Balbi, Bailo of Corfu
- Daniele Lodovico Balbi, Bailo of Corfu
- Lucio Antono Balbi, Bailo of Corfu
- Carlo Balbi, Bailo of Corfu
- Costantino Balbi, 154th Doge of the Republic of Genoa and king of Corsica
- Francesco Maria Balbi, 150th Doge of the Republic of Genoa and king of Corsica
- Pauline Balbi, mother of St. Dionisious of Zante
- Pantaleo Balbi, Venetian Noble
- Giovanni Balbi, Venetia Noble, Latin Bishop of Corfu
- Zafirio Balbi, Priest from Acarnania killed during the Exodus of Messolonghi
- Ioannis Balbis, Priest from Acarnania killed during the Exodus of Messolonghi
- Ioannis Balbis, Noble, Chieftain, Revolutionist in Acarnania during the Greek Revolution of 1821
- Georgios Balbis, Noble, Chieftain, Revolutionist in Acarnania during the Greek Revolution of 1821
- Antonios Balbis, Noble, Member of the Greek Parliament from the Acarnania region, Western Greece
- Dimitrios Balbis, Noble, suffered the raids of Ali Pasha of Ioannina, left Acarnania and settled in Italy, Livorno and Spain where he spent most of his life before the beginning of the Greek Revolution.
- Pantoleon Balbis, Priest from Acarnania, killed during the Exodus of Messolonghi
- Spiridon Balbis, wealthy Trader from Acarnania based in Livorno, Italy
- Maria Balbi, wife of the Famous Greek Poet Kostis Palamas
- Pantoleon Balbis (the younger)
- Zafirios Balbis Lawyer and Politician
- Dimitrios Balbis, Judge, President of the Areios Pagos high court of Greece, Prime Minister of Greece
- Zafeirios or Zinovios Balbis, Judge, Member of the Parliament from Acarnania and Messolonghi, Minister, Prime Minister of Greece
- Periklis Balbis, Member of Filiki Eteria, Secret Society of Revolusionists

== Noble Families related to Balbis ==
- Spinolas
- Lomellinis
- Invreas
- Pallavicinos
- Durazzos
- Papafava
- Caravia (Kallergi)
- Giustiniani
- Barbaro
- Barbo
- Gradenigo
- Siguro o Sicuro
- Barbarigo
- Morosini
- Grimani
- Razi

== Buildings, monuments and places related to Balbis ==
- Gio Agostino's Palace in Genoa (Italy)
- Palace of Giacomo and Pantaleo Balbi knows as Palazzo Balbi Senerega - Today the seat of the University of Genoa's Literature and Philosophy departments (Italy)
- Former Palazzo Balbi - University of Genoa (Italy)
- Palazzo Reale Balbi or Villa Balbi Durazzo Gropallo dello Zerbino, Genoa - Sold to Durrazzo Family and then to the King of Savoy (Italy)
- Via Balbi (Genoa), part of the UNESCO World Heritage Site Le Strade Nuove and the system of the Palazzi dei Rolli in Genoa (Italy)
- Piovera Castle (Alessandria)
- Casa Balbi - Nowadays Balbi Grand Hotel (Sestri Levanti)
- Chateau of Seix (Ariege, France)
- Palazzo Balbi - Nowadays seat of the Veneto Regional Council (Venice)
- House of Balbi in Messolonghi - Nowadays Balbi Library (Greece)
- Fortified House of Balbi in Acarnania (Greece)
- Archontikon Balbi in Santorini (Greece)
- Archontikon Balbi in Patmos (Greece)
- Agios Loggos Church in Zante (Greece)
- Crypta Balbi in Rome (Italy)
- Jesuit College of Genoa a donation of the Balbis (Italy)
- Annunciata di Castelleto Church in Genoa, a donation of the Balbis (Italy)

== Geographical features ==
- Mount Balbi

== See also ==
- Balby
