= Crossing the Rubicon =

Idiom meaning a point of no return

Coordinates: 44.093°N 12.396°E

The phrase "crossing the Rubicon" is an idiom meaning "passing the point of no return". Its meaning comes from the crossing of the Rubicon river by Julius Caesar in January 49 BC at the head of the 13th Legion. Caesar was not allowed to command an army within Italy proper, and by crossing the river with his forces was defying law and risking death. The crossing precipitated a civil war, which eventually led to Caesar becoming dictator for life (dictator perpetuo).

Caesar had previously been appointed governor of a region that stretched from southern Gaul to Illyricum. As his term was coming to an end, the Senate ordered him to disband his army and return to Rome. Caesar defied the order, and instead brought his army to Rome, occupying the city of Ariminum then crossing the Rubicon towards the south. The exact date of the crossing is unknown, but scholars usually place it on the night of 10 and 11 January because of the speeds at which messengers could travel at that time. The phrase alea iacta est ("the die is cast"), allegedly uttered by Caesar just before the crossing, also comes from this event.

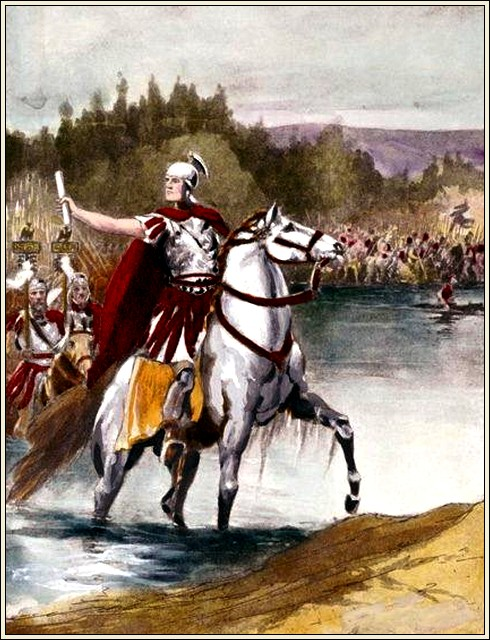
An idealized 1849 illustration of the crossing by Jacob Abbott (History of Julius Caesar). Modern historians, such as Mary Beard, note that Caesar likely crossed at night in a carriage, rather than on horseback as depicted here.

== History ==
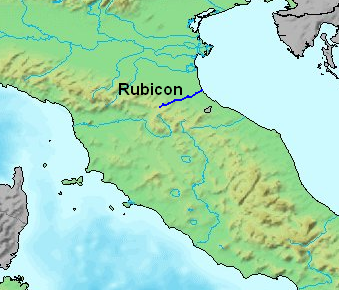
A map of the Rubicon (dark blue), believed to be the same river crossed by Caesar

During the late Roman Republic, the river Rubicon was a small river that flowed east from the Apennine Mountains into the Adriatic Sea. It was one of two rivers that marked the boundary between the Roman province of Cisalpine Gaul to the north and areas controlled directly by Rome and its allies to the south; west of the Apennines, the border was marked by the river Arno, a much wider and more important waterway which flows into the Tyrrhenian Sea.

Governors of Roman provinces were appointed promagistrates with imperium (roughly, "right to command") in one or more provinces. The governors then served as generals of the Roman army within the territory they ruled. Roman law specified that only the elected magistrates (consuls and praetors) could hold imperium within Italy. Any magistrate who entered Italy at the head of his troops forfeited his imperium and was therefore no longer legally allowed to command troops.

Exercising imperium when forbidden by the law was a capital offense. Furthermore, obeying the commands of a general who did not legally possess imperium was a capital offense. If a general entered Italy in command of an army, both the general and his soldiers became outlaws and were automatically condemned to death. Generals were thus obliged to disband their armies before entering Italy.

== Julius Caesar ==
In January 49 BC, Julius Caesar led a Roman legion, Legio XIII, south over the Rubicon from Cisalpine Gaul to Italy to make his way to Rome. In doing so, he deliberately broke the law on imperium and made armed conflict inevitable. Roman historian Suetonius depicts Caesar as undecided as he approached the river and attributes the crossing to a supernatural apparition. It was reported that Caesar dined with Sallust, Hirtius, Oppius, Lucius Balbus and Sulpicus Rufus on the night after his famous crossing into Italy on 10 January. A dramatic moment in literary narratives, the importance of the anecdote is undermined somewhat by Caesar's forces having already crossed into Italy the previous day. By the time Caesar himself entered Italy the war had already begun, with his legate, Quintus Hortensius, occupying the Italian town of Ariminum.

According to Suetonius, Caesar uttered the famous phrase ālea iacta est ("the die has been cast"). The phrase "crossing the Rubicon" has survived to refer to any individual or group committing itself to a risky or revolutionary course of action, similar to the modern phrase "passing the point of no return". Caesar's decision for swift action forced Pompey, the consuls, and a large part of the Roman Senate to flee Rome.

== See also ==
- Posse Comitatus Act
- Rubicon speech
