= Rubicon =

River in northeastern Italy

Rubicon Romagnol: Rubicôn
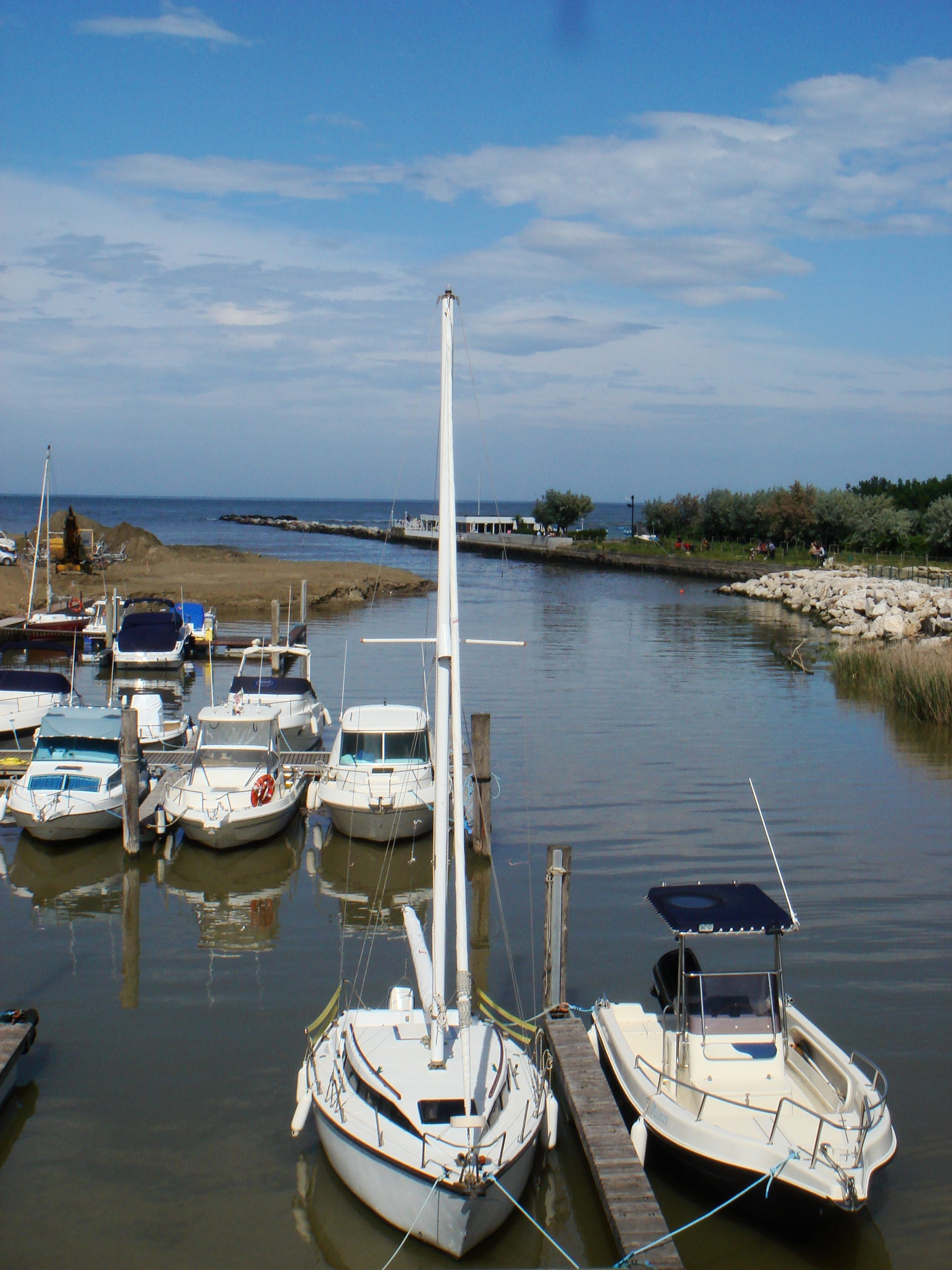
- The mouth of the Rubicon in Bellaria
- Native name: Rubicone (Italian)

Location
- Country: Italy

Physical characteristics
- Source
  - location: Sogliano al Rubicone
  - elevation: 250 m (820 ft)
- Mouth
  - location: Adriatic Sea
  - coordinates: 44.1681°N 12.4431°E
- Length: 80 km (50 mi)

The Rubicon (Latin: Rubico; Italian: Rubicone [rubiˈkoːne]; Romagnol: Rubicôn [rubiˈkoːŋ]) is a shallow river in northeastern Italy, just south of Cesena and north of Rimini. It was known as Fiumicino until 1933, when it was identified with the ancient river Rubicon, crossed by Julius Caesar in 49 BC. The river flows for around 80 km (50 mi) from the Apennine Mountains to the Adriatic Sea through the south of the Emilia-Romagna region, between the towns of Rimini and Cesena.

== Etymology ==
The Latin word Rubico comes from the adjective rubeus, meaning "red". The river was so named because its waters are colored red by iron deposits in the riverbed.

== History ==
During the Roman Republic, the Rubicon marked the boundary between the Roman province of Cisalpine Gaul and the areas directly controlled by Rome and its socii (allies), to the south. On the north-western side, the border was marked by the river Arno, a much wider and more important waterway, which flows westward from the Apennine Mountains (the Arno and the Rubicon rise not far from each other) into the Tyrrhenian Sea.

=== Caesar's crossing ===
In 49 BC, perhaps on 10 January, Julius Caesar led a single legion, Legio XIII Gemina, south over the Rubicon from Cisalpine Gaul to Italy to make his way to Rome. In doing so, he deliberately broke the law limiting his imperium, making armed conflict inevitable. Suetonius ("Divus Julius" 32) depicts Caesar as undecided as he approached the river, and attributes the crossing to a supernatural apparition (thus also in Lucan, 1.185-203). It was reported that Caesar dined with Sallust, Hirtius, Gaius Oppius, Lucius Cornelius Balbus, and Servius Sulpicius Rufus on the night after his crossing.

According to Suetonius, Caesar uttered the famous phrase alea iacta est ('the die is cast') upon crossing the Rubicon, signifying that his action was irreversible. The phrase "crossing the Rubicon" is now used to refer to committing irrevocably to a grave course of action, similar to the modern phrase "passing the point of no return," but with the added connotation of taking a large incremental step that could also not have been taken. The presence of Caesar and his legion in Italy forced Pompey, the consuls, and a large part of the senate to flee Rome. Caesar's victory in the subsequent civil war ensured that he would never be formally punished for his actions, although his crossing did set in motion the events that led to his assassination in 44 BC.

=== Later history ===
After Caesar's crossing, the Rubicon was a geographical feature of note until about 42 BC, when Octavian merged the Province of Cisalpine Gaul into Italia and the river ceased to be the extreme northern border of Italy. The decision robbed the Rubicon of its importance, and the name gradually disappeared from the local toponymy.

After the fall of the Western Roman Empire, and during the first centuries of the Middle Ages, the coastal plain between Ravenna and Rimini was flooded many times. The Rubicon, like other small rivers of the region, often changed its course during this period. For this reason, and to supply fields with water after the revival of agriculture in the late Middle Ages, during the 14th and 15th centuries, hydraulic works were built to prevent other floods and to regulate streams. As a result of this work, these rivers started to flow in straight courses, as they do today.

== Identification ==
With the revival during the fifteenth century of interest in the topography of ancient Roman Italy, the matter of identifying the Rubicon in the contemporary landscape became a topic of debate among Renaissance humanists. To support the claim of the river Pisciatello, a spurious inscription forbidding the passage of an army in the name of the Roman people and Senate, the so-called Sanctio, was placed by a bridge on that river. The Quattrocento humanist Flavio Biondo was deceived by it; the actual inscription is conserved in the Museo Archeologico, Cesena. As the centuries went by, several rivers of the Adriatic coast between Ravenna and Rimini have at times been said to correspond to the ancient Rubicon.

The Via Aemilia (modern SS 9) still follows its original Roman course as it runs between the hills and the plain; it would have been the obvious course to follow as it was the only major Roman road east of the Apennine Mountains leading to and from the Po Valley. Attempts to deduce the original course of the Rubicon can be made only by studying written documents and other archaeological evidence such as Roman milestones, which indicate the distance between the ancient river and the nearest Roman towns.

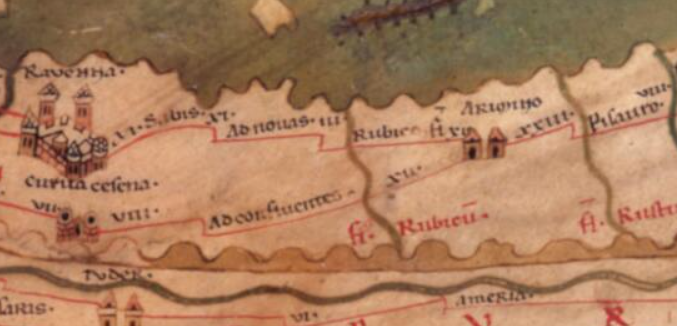
Detail of the Tabula Peutingeriana around the Rubicon

The mile zero of a Roman road, from which distances were counted, was always the crossing between the Cardo and the Decumanus, the two principal streets in every Roman town, running north–south and east–west respectively. In a section of the Tabula Peutingeriana, a medieval copy of a Late Antique document showing the network of Roman roads, a river in northeastern Italy labeled "fl. Rubicum" is shown at a position 12 Roman miles (18 km, 11 mi) north of Rimini along the coastline; this is the distance between Rimini and a place called "Ad Confluentes," drawn west of the Rubicon, on the Via Aemilia. However, the river-bed shape observed in Pisciatello and the Rubicon river in the present day, well below Roman-age soil layers, is likely to indicate that any possible course modification of rivers could have occurred only very close to the coastline, and therefore only slight.

Furthermore, the features of the present-day Rubicon river (north–south course, orthogonal to the Via Aemilia) and the Via Aemilia itself (a straight reach before and after the crossing, and a turn just passing by San Giovanni in Compito, so marking a possible administrative boundary) are common to typical geographically oriented limits of Roman age, being what made this a clue of actual identification of the present-day Rubicon River with the Fiumicino.

In 1933, after various efforts that spanned centuries, the Fiumicino, which crossed the town of Savignano di Romagna (now Savignano sul Rubicone), was officially identified as the former Rubicon. Strong evidence supporting this theory came in 1991, when three Italian scholars (Pignotti, Ravagli, and Donati), after a comparison between the Tabula Peutingeriana and other ancient sources (including Cicero), showed that the distance from Rome to the Rubicon River was 200 Roman miles. Key elements of their work are:

- The locality of San Giovanni in Compito (now a western quarter of Savignano) has to be identified with the old Ad Confluentes (compitum means "road junction", and is synonymous with confluentes).
- The distance between Ad Confluentes and Rome, according to the Tabula Peutingeriana, is 201 Roman miles.
- The distance from today's San Giovanni in Compito and the Fiumicino river is one Roman mile (1.48 km, 0.92 mi).

== Present ==
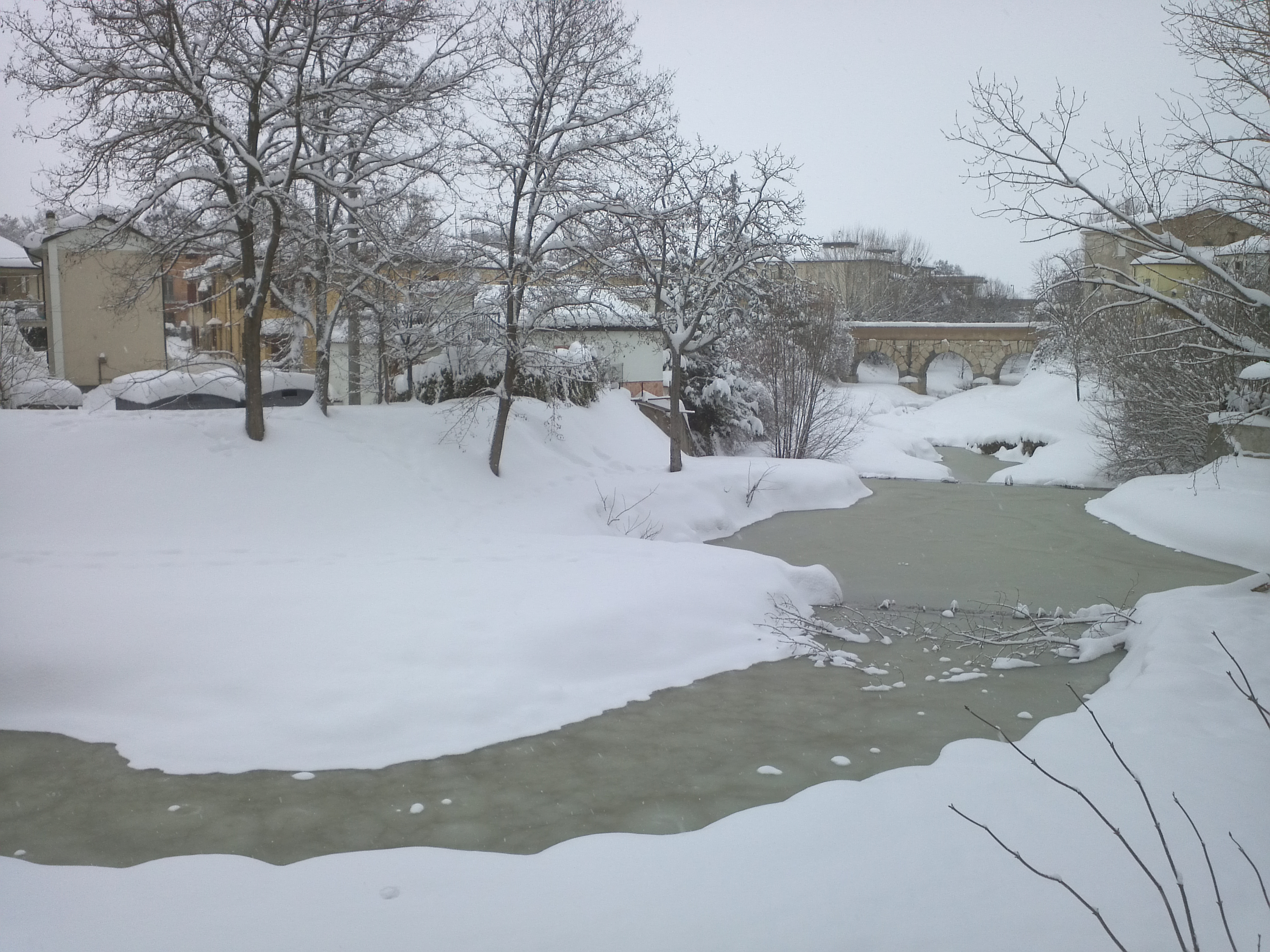
The Rubicon in winter.

Today there is no visible, material evidence of Caesar's historical passage. Savignano sul Rubicone is an industrial town and the river has become one of the most polluted in the Emilia-Romagna region. Exploitation of underground waters along the upper course of the Rubicon has reduced its flow—it was a minor river even during Roman times ("parvi Rubiconis ad undas" as Lucan said, "to the waves of [the] tiny Rubicon")—and has since lost its natural route, except in its upper course, between low and woody hills.
