= Diecast =

Diecast may refer to:

- Die casting, the casting process where liquids are introduced into a mold and allowed to harden
- Die-cast toys, scale models, usually of automobiles, that are often made via casting
- Diecast (band), a Boston-based metalcore band
- Alea iacta est, Latin for "The die is cast"
