= Lucius Cornelius Balbus (proconsul) =

1st century BCE Roman politician and general of Punic descent

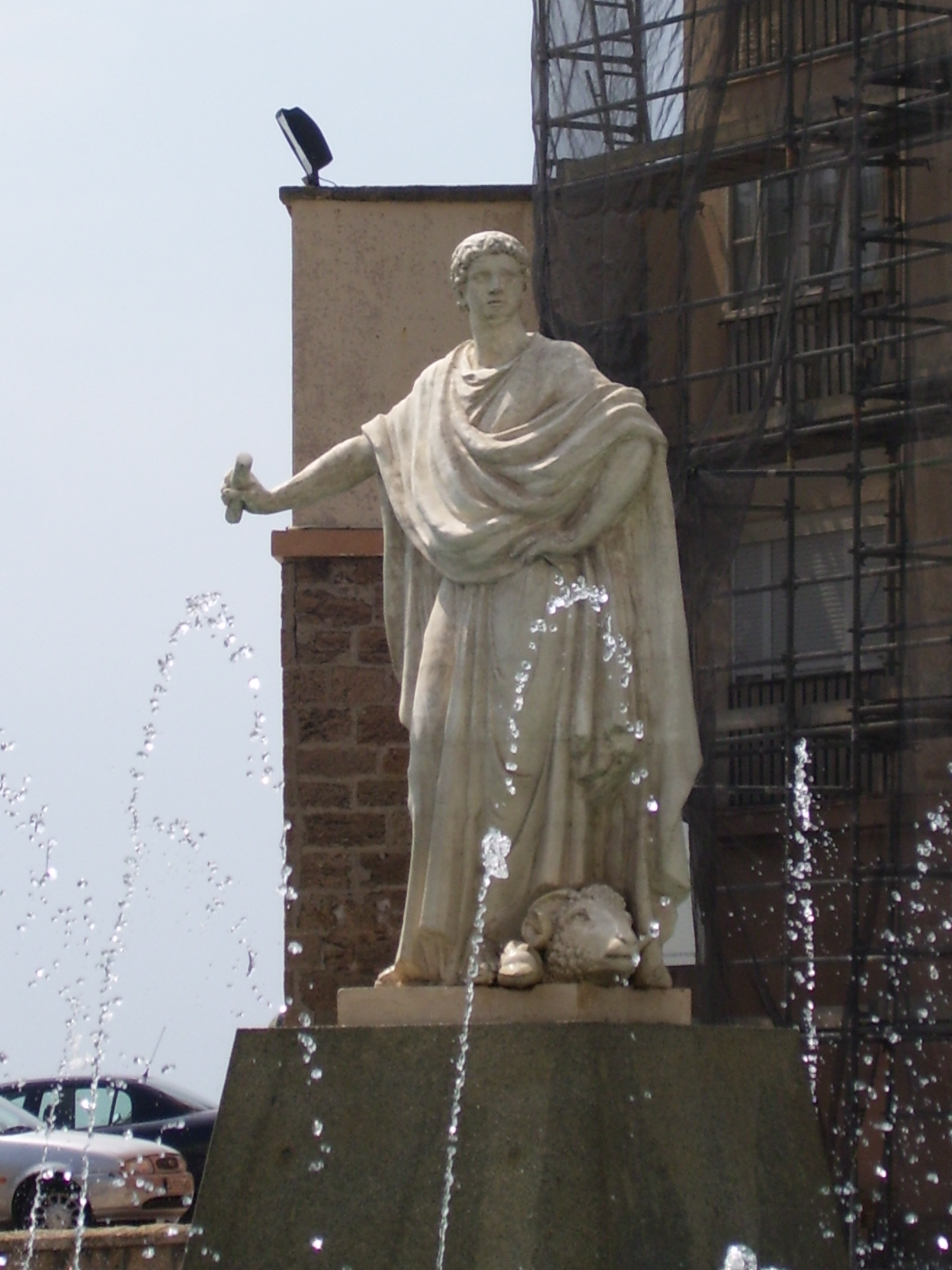
- Statue of Balbus in Cádiz, Spain
- Born: around 1st century BC; Cádiz, Southern Spain
- Died: after 13 BC
- Occupations: Politician; General
- Office: Quaestor (Hispania Ulterior) (43 BC); Proconsul (Africa) (21−20 BC)
- Relatives: Publius Cornelius Balbus (father)

Military service
- Battles/wars: Caesar's civil war; Alexandrian war

Lucius Cornelius Balbus, often referred to as Lucius Cornelius Balbus Minor, (not before 60 BC – after 13 BC), son of Publius Cornelius Balbus, was a Roman politician and General. Similarly to his uncle Balbus the Elder, Balbus Minor was also born in Gades with Punic origins, and became a distinguished member of the gens Cornelia through adoption. Despite his Phoenician ancestry, Balbus rendered valuable services to the early Roman Empire, most notably by serving as the proconsul of Africa in 21 BC and leading an expedition to sub-Saharan Africa. He was also known to be a close friend and trusted associate of Julius Caesar.

== Biography ==
Not much is known about the early life of Balbus due to the scarce and limited historical record available from that time. Records indicate that Balbus was born in the ancient city of Gades in the province of Hispania Ulterior to a Phoenician family. He later received his Roman citizenship simultaneously with his uncle in around 70 BC by gaining the favour of Gnaeus Pompey.

=== In Caesar's civil war ===
Balbus was an important supporter of Julius Caesar in his civil war, in which he was entrusted with several missions. He also has participated in the Alexandrian and Spanish wars. For his loyalty and valuable services to Caesar in the civil war, Balbus was awarded, by him, with his admission to the College of Pontiffs, a prestigious religious office. In 43 BC he was entrusted with the office of Quaestor in Hispania Ulterior (Further Spain). He then further accumulated fortune by pillaging and looting the inhabitants of the region.

In that very year he crossed over to meet Bogud, king of Mauretania. His presence in historical records fades away until the year 21 BC.

Balbus seems to have dedicated some of his focus to literature: he wrote a play about his visit to Lentulus in Pompey's camp at Dyrrhachium. As reported by Macrobius, he was the author of Ἐξηγητικά (Exegetica), a work engaging with Gods and their worship.

=== During the early Roman Empire ===
In 21 BC, Balbus was appointed as Proconsul of Africa. Mommsen thinks that he had incurred the displeasure of Augustus by his conduct as praetor, and that his African appointment after so many years was due to his exceptional capabilities for the post.

In 19 BC Balbus defeated the Garamantes, and on 27 March in that year received the honour of a triumph, which was then for the first time granted to one who was not a Roman citizen by birth, and for the last time to a private individual.

== Balbus' theatre ==
Balbus built a new theatre, called theatre of Balbus, in Rome in 13 BC, connected to his Crypta Balbi complex in the South-Eastern part of the Campus Martius.

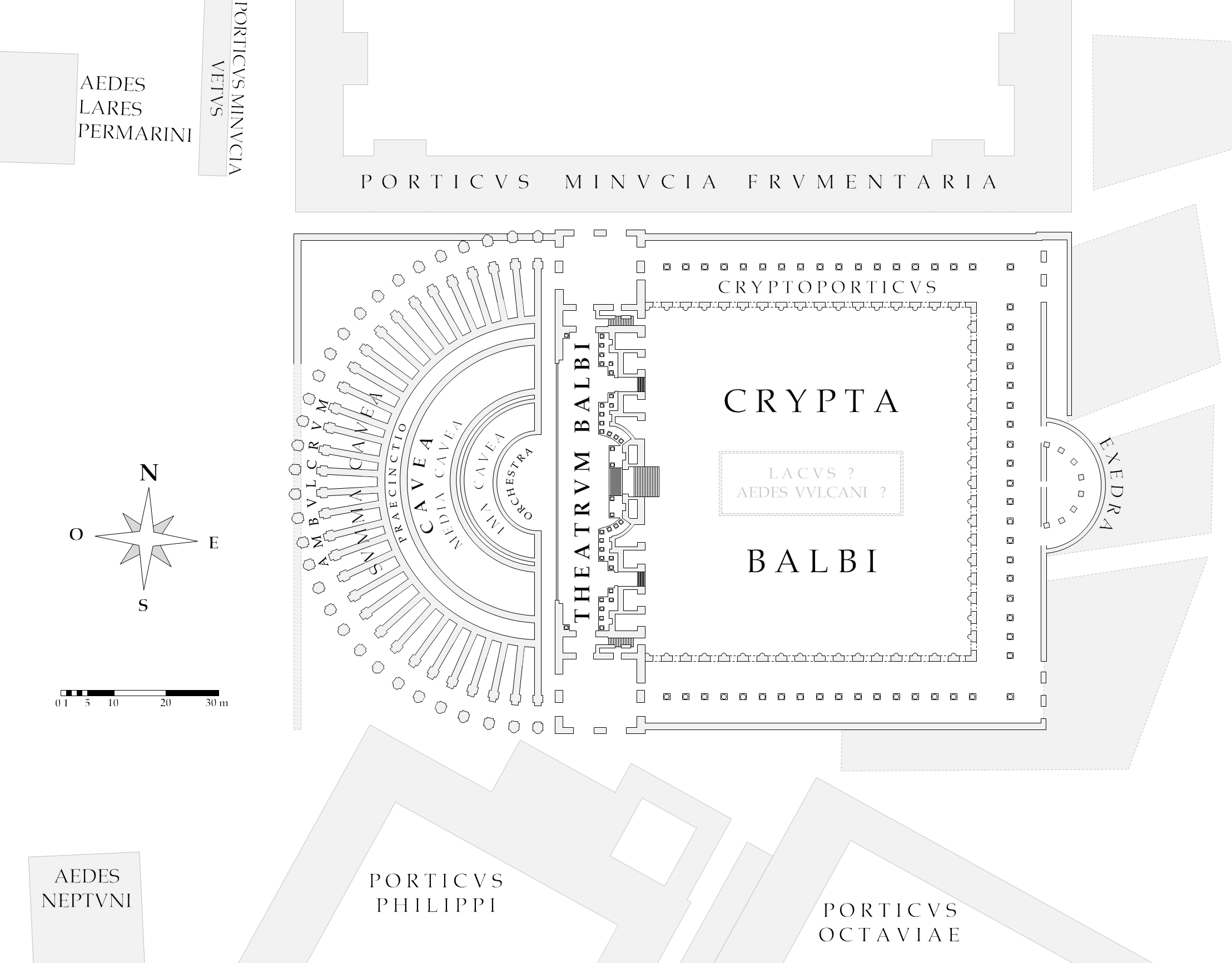
Plan of the Crypta Balbi and the theatre of Balbus

Some of the reasons for the construction were the high demand of innovative and new buildings in the capital and the desire for fame and favor from his supporters, including the emperor Augustus. Due to these factors, Balbus decided to build a theatre near the Theatre of Pompey. Although his theatre was smaller than Pompey's, as cited by Pliny the Elder, it possessed its own unique richness: the theatre of Balbus featured four small columns made of Onyx, which were destroyed during the fall of the Roman Empire.

The theatre was destroyed by a fire that erupted during the reign of Titus, but it was after restored, experts say, by Domitian.

Balbus' theatre could have held around 11,510 spectators.

== Expedition to sub-Saharan Africa ==
Lucius Cornelius Balbus Minor planned to conquer the inhabited African lands, during or in the aftermath of crossing the Saharan desert. Thus, in around 20-19 BC he decided to set off from Sabratha, a Roman city located in today's North-Western Libya and near the Libyan desert, to begin the expedition. The Sahara experiences relatively extreme temperatures and conditions that are unsuitable for horses or other animals due to the softness of sand. As a result, Balbus opted for camels instead of horses and mules for the expedition. Balbus also had infantry with him, comprising the largest part of the army. The exact size of his armed force is unclear, but it is estimated that Balbus had around 10,000 soldiers, including an unknown number of camels.

=== Reasons ===
The Garamantes heavily relied on commerce between the other populations living in or near the desert. Since the duty of the nomads on the goods en route were intense, the Roman merchants requested an expedition against the Garamantes to soften the duty. The expedition would aim the conquest of the city of Garama, an important city for the Garamantes, eliminating the tributes for the nomads of the desert, and occupying some mercantile routes for the advantage of the Romans.

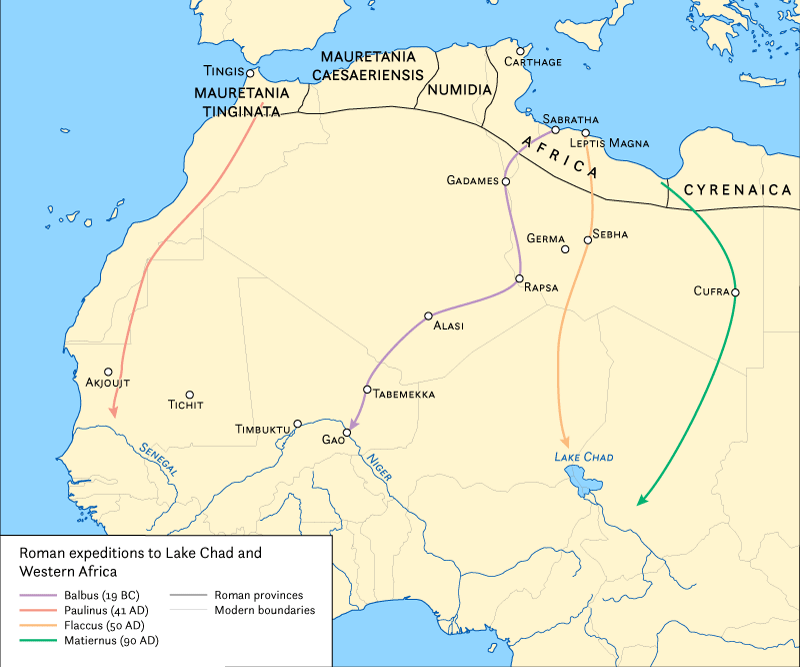
Trans-Saharan roman expeditions-explorations. See Balbus' expedition in purple.

=== The expedition and crossing of the Sahara ===
Balbus had planned his expedition carefully: it is a plausible evidence that the use of spies and explorers was employed to gather news and intelligence against the Garamantes. The spies were sent to the heart of the Saharan desert, where they would frequently control the caravan routes. Balbus also gathered specific maps for the expedition, organized supplies and tools for his troops, and he had officials and cavalry of the army taught to ride camels.

Ready for the voyage, the army departed for the oasis city of Cydamus. Upon arriving in the city, the troops refreshed themselves by raiding the locals of the oasis. The expedition continued southwards, covering around 650 km through a rocky desert (Hamada el-Hamra), conquering the most important towns and cities of the region, including the capital city of Garama. From there, Balbus could have sent an exploratory expedition even further Southern part of the Sahara, the Fezzan, perhaps reaching the Niger River.

== See also ==
- Romans in sub-Saharan Africa
- Roman Libya
- Tin Hinan Tomb
- Leptis Magna
- Theatre of ancient Rome

== Sources ==
=== Primary sources ===
These sources mainly comprise the largest or possibly the entirety of the first historiography.

- Cassius Dio - Roman history - LIV.
- Suetonius - Lives of the Caesars - Augustus.
- Tacitus - Annales - III.
- Pliny the Elder - Naturalis Historia - V.
