= Publius Cornelius Balbus =

Ancient Hispanic aristocrat

Publius Cornelius Balbus was a man from Gades (present-day (Cádiz) in the province of Hispania in Ancient Rome. He lived in the 1st century BCE.

Balbus was the brother of Lucius Cornelius Balbus, the general who served in Hispania under Pompey and Metellus Pius against Quintus Sertorius during the Sertorian War. Publius himself was the friend of several important people in Rome, and was given by Pompey the task of negotiating with Cicero, and suggesting an alliance with Crassus and Pompey.

These Balbi were peregrinus, and the whole family -- including Lucius, Publius, and Publius's son, Lucius Cornelius Balbus Minor -- were granted Roman citizenship at the same time, on account of Lucius's and Publius's service to Pompey.

Publius appears to have died soon after receiving citizenship, either in Gades or Rome.
