= Theatre of Balbus =

Ancient Roman theater in Rome

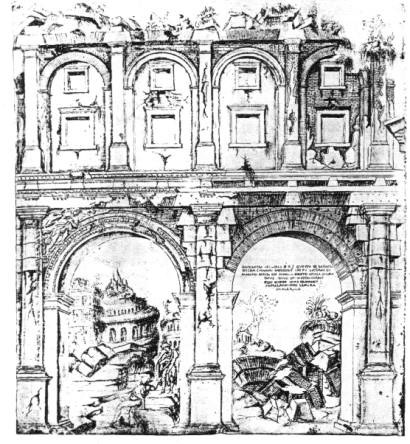
- View of the theater's remains in 1561 by Giuliano da Sangallo.

- Location within Rome
- 41°53′39″N 12°28′41″E
- Type: Roman theatre (structure)
- Location: Regio IX Circus Flaminius

History
- Built: 19 BC
- Built by: Lucius Cornelius Balbus (minor)

Theatre of Balbus was an ancient Roman structure in the Campus Martius of Rome. It was built in 13 BC by proconsul Lucius Cornelius Balbus (minor), likely from the spoils of a military campaign by order of Augustus (Cassius Dio 54.18.2; Pliny the Elder, Natural History (Pliny) 36.59-60).

Very little is mentioned of the theatre in ancient writings. Its location was debated for decades until pieces of the Forma Urbis were finally pieced together in the 1960s. Excavations of the theatre began in 1981 and are still ongoing, however, the main portion of the crypta finished in 2000. Today what has been excavated can be seen at the Museo Nazionale Romano Crypta Balbi (National Museum of Rome), which is located at Via delle Botteghe Oscure, 31, (corner of Via M. Caetani).

The museum is located in what was the crypta or courtyard in the rear of the theater's complex behind the stage. This courtyard was the smallest of all of Rome's major theatres. Here patrons would stroll between acts of a performance and seek refreshment. A catalogue complied at the end of the 4th century recorded that the theatre's seating capacity was 11,510 persons.

Currently, remains of the theater are preserved, showcasing 'opus quadratum' and 'opus reticulatum' construction techniques in the lower part of the cavea. Behind the theater was the porticus post scaenam, known as the Crypta Balbi.

== See also ==
- List of ancient monuments in Rome
- List of Roman theatres

== Sources ==
- Rendina, Claudio (1999). L'enciclopedia di Roma. Rome: Newton Compton.
