= Alea iacta est =

Latin phrase attributed to Julius Caesar

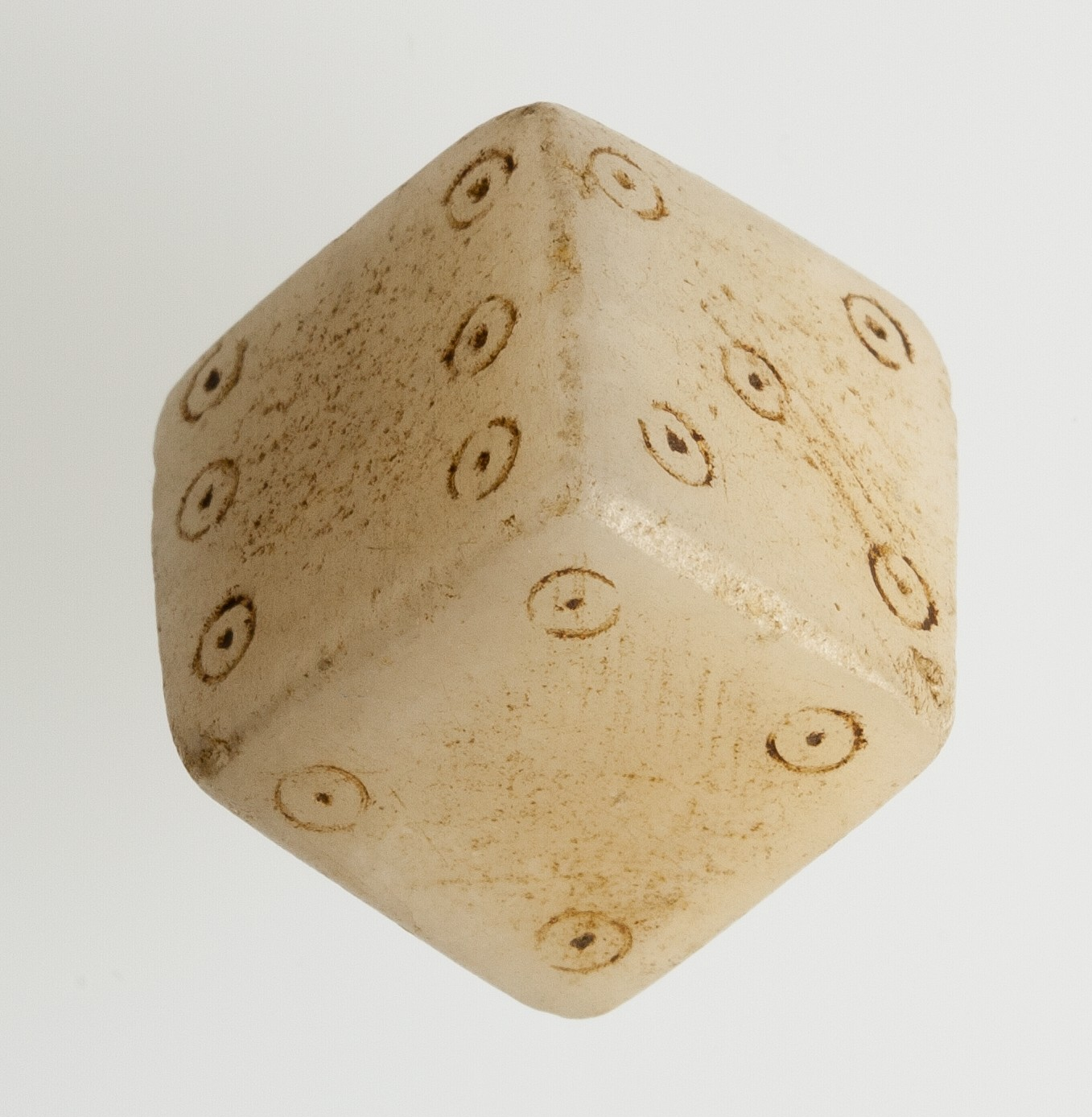
A six-sided Roman die

Alea iacta est is a Latin phrase meaning "The die is cast". It is a variation of the words spoken by Julius Caesar at the crossing of the Rubicon on 10 January 49 BC. The phrase, referring to a game of chance played with dice, indicates that events have passed a point of no return and the outcome is uncertain.

The Rubicon river in northern Italy marked the southern boundary of Caesar's province of Cisalpine Gaul and therefore the extent of his imperium (the legal right to command troops). By leading his soldiers across the river, Caesar was defying a direct order from the Roman Senate and beginning a civil war.

The ancient historian Suetonius reports that Caesar actually said iacta alea est ([ˈjakta ˈaːlɛ.a ˈɛs̺t]), which has the same English translation. Plutarch states that Caesar was speaking in Greek: ἀνερρίφθω κύβος (anerrhī́phthō kýbos), literally "let a die be cast", metaphorically "let the game be played". Suetonius's Latin version is a statement about the inevitability of what is to come, while the Greek version contains a self-encouragement to venture forward. The Greek version is probably a quotation from a play by Menander; the historian Arrian states that it was already well known.

The Latin version is the most commonly cited in modern sources, but with the word order changed to alea iacta est. It is used both untranslated or translated in many languages. The related phrase "crossing the Rubicon" has become an idiom with closely related meaning.

== Origin and forms ==
The phrase probably originated with the ancient Greek playwright Menander, in his comedic play Ἀρρηφόρος (Arrephoros, 'The Bearer of Ritual Objects') (Note: Also known as Αὐλητρίς (Auletris 'The Courtesan Flute-Player)'). The full text of that play has been lost, but a short dialogue from it has been preserved in quotation by Athenaeus. The dialogue uses the phrase to refer to a marriage that has been agreed but not yet performed. (Note: Deipnosophistae by Athenaeus of Naucratis, book 13, paragraph 8: A: "If you've got any sense, you won't get married and give up living like this. I'm married myself—which is why I'm advising you not to do it." B: "It's all decided; the die's been cast." A: "Go ahead—and good luck. Because you're going to throw yourself into a real sea of troubles now, and not the Libyan or the Aegean sea..., where less than three ships out of thirty get wrecked. Not one married man escapes undamaged.") Caesar was fluent in Greek and considered Menander a great playwright. (Note: Caesar's respect for Menander is recorded in one of Caesar's poems, preserved in Suetonius's The Twelve Caesars. In the poem, Caesar praises the playwright Terence, saying that he is "ranked with the highest", but despite this is only a "half-sized Menander".)

The crossing of the Rubicon is described by Plutarch in Parallel Lives, written in Greek over a century after the events. He explicitly reports that Caesar spoke in Greek, but does not mention Menander:

Ἑλληνιστὶ πρὸς τοὺς παρόντας ἐκβοήσας, «Ἀνερρίφθω κύβος», [anerrhī́phthō kýbos] διεβίβαζε τὸν στρατόν.

He [Caesar] declared in Greek with loud voice to those who were present "Let a die be cast" and led the army across.

— Plutarch, Life of Pompey, 60.2.9 (Note: See also Plutarch's Life of Caesar 32.8.4 and Sayings of Kings & Emperors 206c.)

Appian wrote a history of Caesar's civil war, also in Greek around the same time as Plutarch was writing. He reports a very similar phrase and asserts that it was already well-known. However he does not indicate which language Caesar was speaking:

καὶ εἰπὼν οἷά τις ἔνθους ἐπέρα σὺν ὁρμῇ, τὸ κοινὸν τόδε ἐπειπών· «Ὁ κύβος ἀνερρίφθω».

Then speaking like a man inspired, he surged across, uttering the familiar phrase, "Let the die be cast".

— Appian, The Civil Wars, 2.35

The Roman historian Suetonius was a contemporary of Plutarch and Appian. He wrote a biography of Caesar in Latin, and reports the phrase in Latin:

Caesar: "... iacta alea est", inquit.

Caesar said, "The die is cast".

— Suetonius, Vita Divi Iuli (The Life of the Deified Julius), 121 AD, paragraph 32

The Latin word alea refers to a game with dice, or more generally to a game of hazard or chance. Dice were common in Roman times and were usually thrown three at a time. There were two common forms: six-sided dice known tesserae and four-sided dice known as tali. In Ancient Greek the word for a single die was κύβος kybos.

== See also ==
- Aleatoricism
- List of Latin phrases
