= Gaius Oppius =

Roman historian and friend of Julius Caesar

Gaius Oppius was an intimate friend of Julius Caesar. He managed the dictator's private affairs during his absence from Rome, and, together with Lucius Cornelius Balbus, exercised considerable influence in the city.

According to Suetonius (Caesar, 56), many authorities considered Oppius to have written the histories of the Spanish, African and Alexandrian wars which were published as the works of Caesar himself. It is now generally held that he may possibly have written the account of the Alexandrian war (although the claims of Hirtius are considered stronger), but certainly not those of the Spanish and the African wars, although Niebuhr (the Danish-German Romantic era historian) confidently assigned the Bellum Africanum to him. The writer of these latter accounts took an actual part in the wars they described, whereas Oppius was in Rome at the time.

Oppius also wrote a life of Caesar and the elder Scipio.

After Caesar's death Oppius apparently wrote a pamphlet attempting to prove that Caesarion, Cleopatra's son, was not actually fathered by Caesar as she claimed.
