= Lucius Cornelius Balbus (consul 40 BC) =

1st century BC Roman politician and businessman of Punic descent, consul in 40 BC

Lucius Cornelius Balbus (fl. 1st century BC) or Balbus the Elder, was a wealthy Roman politician and businessman who played a significant role in the emergence of the Principate from the Roman Republic. He was a prominent supporter of Julius Caesar and a close advisor to the emperor Augustus. Of Punic origin, Balbus was born in the early first century BC in Gades (present-day Cádiz), Hispania. He was the first naturalized citizen to become a Roman consul.

== Biography ==
Balbus served in Hispania under Pompey and Metellus Pius against Sertorius. For his services against Sertorius, Roman citizenship was conferred upon him and his family—including his brother Publius Cornelius Balbus and nephew Lucius Cornelius Balbus – by Pompey. He accompanied Pompey on his return to Rome in 71 BC, and was for a long time one of his most intimate friends. He also gained the friendship of Julius Caesar, who placed great confidence in him. Balbus' personal friendships with Pompey and Caesar were instrumental in the formation of the First Triumvirate. He was a chief financier in Rome. Balbus served under Caesar as chief engineer (praefectus fabrum) when Caesar was propraetor to Hispania in 61 BC, and proconsul to Gaul in 58 BC.

His position as a naturalized foreigner, his influence, and his wealth naturally made Balbus many enemies, who in 56 BC put up a native of Gades to prosecute him for illegally assuming the rights of a Roman citizen, a charge directed against the triumvirs equally with himself. Cicero (whose speech has been preserved), Pompey and Crassus all spoke on his behalf, and he was acquitted. During Caesar's civil war, Balbus did not take any open part against Pompey, though it was reported that Balbus dined with Caesar, Sallust, Hirtius, Oppius, and Sulpicus Rufus on the night after his famous crossing over the Rubicon river into Italy, which took place on January 10, 49 BC. He endeavored to get Cicero to mediate between Caesar and Pompey, with the object of preventing him from definitely siding with the latter, and Cicero admits that he was dissuaded from doing so, against his better judgement.

Balbus attached himself to Caesar, and, in conjunction with Oppius, managed the entirety of Caesar's affairs in Rome. Subsequently, Balbus became Caesar's private secretary, and Cicero was obliged to ask for his good offices with Caesar. After Caesar's murder in 44 BC, Balbus was equally successful in gaining the favour of Octavian; in 43 BC or 42 BC he was praetor, and in 40 BC he became the first naturalized Roman citizen to attain the consulship. The year of his death is not known. Balbus kept a diary of the chief events in his own and Caesar's life (Ephemeris), which has been lost (Suetonius, Caesar, 81). He took care that Caesar's Commentaries on the Gallic War should be continued; and accordingly the 8th book of the Commentarii de Bello Gallico (which was probably written by his friend Hirtius at his instigation) is dedicated to him.

== Notes ==
Political offices
| Preceded by Gn. Domitius Calvinus; G. Asinius Pollio | Roman consul 40 BC (suffectus); With: Publius Canidius Crassus | Succeeded by L. Marcius Censorinus; G. Calvisius Sabinus |
