= De Paepe =

De Paepe is a Dutch surname. Paep is another word for 'Pope'.

== People ==
- César De Paepe: Belgian prominent syndicalist.
- Javier de Paepe: Argentine badminton player.
- Léon-Jean de Paepe: President of the Privy Council of Hapsburg Netherlands
- Lorne De Pape: Olympic curler of New Zealand.
- Thomas de Paep: Flemish painter

== See also ==
- 26849 De Paepe, as asteroid
- DePape (surname)
- Pape (surname)
