= Papé =

Papé is a surname. Notable people with the surname include:

- Pascal Papé (born 1980), French rugby player
- Randy Papé (1950–2008), American businessman and philanthropist
- Frank C. Papé (1878–1972), English artist and book illustrator

== See also ==
- Pape (surname)
- DePape (surname)
- Pape (disambiguation)
