= Pape =

Pape or PAPE may refer to:

== People ==
- Pape (given name)
- Papé Diakité (born 1992), Senegalese soccer player
- Pape (surname)
- Papé (surname)

== Places ==
- Pape Rock, Antarctica
- Pape (TTC), a subway station in Toronto, Ontario, Canada
- Pape Avenue Cemetery, Toronto, Ontario, Canada
- Pape Village, a commercial district in Toronto, Ontario, Canada
- Pape, Montenegro, a village in northern Montenegro
- Pape, Missouri, a community in the United States
- Luxor, Egypt (Coptic: ⲡⲁⲡⲉ, romanized: Pape)

== Other uses ==
- Le Pape (French: The Pope), a political tract in verse by Victor Hugo
- Du Pape (French: The Pope), an 1819 philosophy book by Joseph de Maistre
- Pope (French: pape), head of the Roman Catholic Church
  - By extension, "Pape" is Scottish slang for a Catholic
- Provider Authentication Policy Extension, an anti-phishing extension to OpenID

== See also ==
- DePape (surname)
- Papes (disambiguation)
- Pope (disambiguation)
