= Pape (given name) =

Pape is a given name. Notable people with the name include:

- Pape Badiane (born 1980), French basketball player
- Pape Cabral (born 2007), French footballer
- Pape Abdou Camara (born 1991), Senegalese footballer
- Pape Samba Ba (born 1982), Senegalese footballer
- Pape Cire Dia (born 1980), Senegalese football
- Pape Diakhaté (born 1984), Senegalese footballer
- Pape Moussa Diakhatè (born 1989), Senegalese footballer
- Papé Diakite (born 1992), Senegalese footballer
- Pape Maly Diamanka (born 1990), Senegalese footballer
- Pape Diop (born 1954), Senegalese politician
- Pape Alioune Diop (died 2012), Senegalese football coach
- Pape Bouba Diop (born 1978), Senegalese footballer
- Pape Malick Diop (born 1974), Senegalese footballer
- Pape Seydou Diop (born 1979), Senegalese footballer
- Pape Diouf (1951–2020), Senegalese journalist and football manager
- Pape Alioune Diouf (born 1989), Senegalese footballer
- Pape Mamadou Diouf (born 1982), Senegalese footballer
- Pape Paté Diouf (born 1986), Senegalese footballer
- Pape Niokhor Fall (born 1977), Senegalese footballer
- Pape Omar Faye (born 1987), Senegalese footballer
- Pape Maguette Kebe (born 1979), Senegalese footballer
- Pape Moussa Konaté (born 1993), Senegalese footballer
- Pape M'Bow (born 1988), Senegalese footballer
- Pape Hamadou N'Diaye (born 1977), Senegalese footballer
- Pape Latyr N'Diaye (born 1977), Senegalese footballer
- Pape Paye (born 1990), French footballer
- Pape Landing Sambou (born 1987), Senegalese footballer
- Pape Sané (born 1990), Senegalese footballer
- Pape Sarr (born 1977), French-Senegalese footballer
- Pape Matar Sarr (born 2002), Senegalese footballer
- Pape Souaré (born 1990), Senegalese footballer
- Pape Sow (born 1981), Senegalese basketball player
- Pape Habib Sow (born 1985), Senegalese footballer
- Pape Sy (born 1988), French-Senegalese basketball player
- Pape Thiaw (born 1981), Senegalese footballer
