= Pape (surname) =

Pape is a surname. Notable people with the surname include:

- Albert Pape (1897–1955), English footballer
- Albert Pape (fencer) (1880–?), Belgian fencer
- Alexander August Wilhelm von Pape (1813–1895), Prussian field marshal
- Andy Pape (born 1955), American-born Danish composer
- Andy Pape (footballer) (born 1962), English footballer
- Arthur Pape (1890–1945), English cricketer
- Bryan Pape, Australian academic
- Burkhard Pape (1932–2024), German footballer
- Chris Pape, American graffiti artist
- Frank C. Papé (1878–1972), English artist and book illustrator
- Jean-Henri Pape (1789–1875), French piano maker
- George Pape (1903–1987), Australian lawyer and judge
- Gérard Pape (born 1955), American composer
- Günther Pape (1907–1986), German general
- Janick Pape (born 1988), German politician
- Ken Pape (born 1951), American baseball player
- Larry Pape (1885–1918), American baseball player
- Lorne De Pape (born 1955), Canadian-born New Zealand curler
- Lygia Pape (1927–2004), Brazilian artist
- Madeleine Pape (born 1984), Australian runner
- Maiken Pape (born 1978), Danish footballer
- Oran Pape (1904–1936), American police officer
- Pascal Papé (born 1980), French rugby player
- Paul Pape (born 1952), American actor and voice actor
- Philip Pape (1910-1982), British sculptor
- Ralph Pape, American playwright
- René Pape (born 1964), German operatic bass
- Richard Pape (1916–1995), British World War II escapee, adventurer, autobiographer and novelist
- Robert Pape (born 1960), American political scientist
- Scott Pape, Australian radio personality
- Tony Pape (born 1981), American football player
- Wilhelm Pape (1807–1854), German philologist and lexicographer

== See also ==
- Papé (surname)
- DePape (surname)
- Pape (disambiguation)
