= DePape =

DePape is a surname with Dutch origins, mostly found in US, Canada, and Belgium.

== People ==
People with the name include:

- Brigette DePape (born 1989), Canadian activist
- David Wayne DePape (born 1980), a suspect in the 2022 attack on Paul Pelosi
- Lorne De Pape (born 1955), Canadian-born New Zealander curler

== Fictional characters ==
- Roy Depape, a fictional character from Stephen King's The Dark Tower series

== See also ==
- De Paepe
- Pape (surname)
- Pape (disambiguation)
