= Pape Landing Sambou =

Senegalese footballer

Personal information
- Date of birth: December 25, 1987 (age 38)
- Place of birth: Dakar
- Position: Defender

Team information
- Current team: CF Mounana

Senior career*
Years	Team	Apps	(Gls)
2005–06	AS Police		
2006–07	Dakar UC		
2007–08	B68 Toftir		
2008–09	ASC HLM		
2009–10	Olympique de Ngor		
2010–	CF Mounana		

International career
2006–07	Senegal U23	?	(?)
2012	Gabon	1	(0)
- * Club domestic league appearances and goals

Pape Landing Sambou (born December 25, 1987) is a Senegal-born football player who has represented Gabon at international level.

== International career ==
Sambou represented Senegal at U23 level during qualification for the 2007 All-Africa Games football tournament.

He represented Gabon in an international friendly versus South Africa on 15 July 2012.
