= Thomas de Paep =

Flemish still life painter

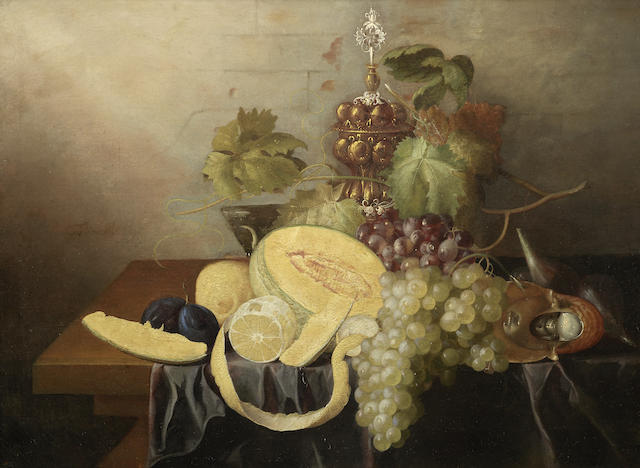
A split melon, lemon, grapes, figs and other fruit on a draped table-top

Thomas de Paep (ca. 1628–1630, in Mechelen – 1670, in Mechelen) was a Flemish painter who specialised in still lifes and in particular fruit still lifes. He was active in Mechelen.

== Life ==
Very little is known about this artist who was active in Mechelen, an artistic centre not far removed from Antwerp, the key artistic hub in the Southern Netherlands. In 1638 he was a pupil of Jean Baptiste (II) Saive. In 1648 he became a master in the Mechelen Guild of Saint Luke.

He remained active in Mechelen until his death in 1670.

== Work ==
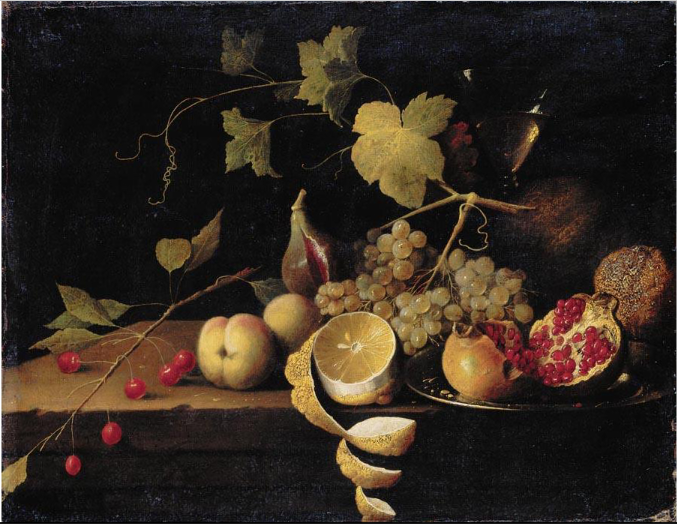
Still life of cherries, peaches, a half-peeled lemon

Thomas de Paep painted still lifes, usually with fruit and ancillary objects. These works appear to have been influenced by Jan Davidsz. de Heem, who worked in Antwerp close to Mechelen.

A landscape with a red cockerel between two hens, one black and one white, the latter clucking over two chicks; a ruined wall behind and in the distance a mountainous landscape (Royal Collection, dated 1650–1670) has been attributed to de Paep.
