= List of Latin phrases (M) =

This page is one of a series listing English translations of notable Latin phrases, such as veni, vidi, vici and et cetera. Some of the phrases are themselves translations of Greek phrases, as ancient Greek rhetoric and literature started centuries before the beginning of Latin literature in ancient Rome.

Latin	Translation	Notes
Macte animo! Generose puer sic itur ad astra	Young, cheer up! This is the way to the skies.	Motto of Academia da Força Aérea (Air Force Academy) of the Brazilian Air Force
macte virtute sic itur ad astra	those who excel, thus reach the stars	or "excellence is the way to the stars"; frequent motto; from Virgil's Aeneid IX.641 (English, Dryden)
magister dixit	the teacher has said it	Canonical medieval reference to Aristotle, precluding further discussion
magister meus Christus	Christ is my teacher	common Catholic edict and motto of a Catholic private school, Andrean High School in Merrillville, Indiana
Magna Carta	Great Charter	Set of documents from 1215 between Pope Innocent III, King John of England, and English barons.
magna cum laude	with great praise	Common Latin honor, above cum laude and below summa cum laude
magna di curant, parva neglegunt	The gods care about great matters, but they neglect small ones	Cicero, De Natura Deorum 2:167
magna est vis consuetudinis	great is the power of habit	
Magna Europa est patria nostra	Greater Europe is Our Fatherland	Political motto of pan-Europeanists
magno cum gaudio	with great joy	
magnum opus	great work	Said of someone's masterpiece
magnum vectigal est parsimonia	Economy is a great revenue	Cicero, Paradoxa 6/3:49. Sometimes translated into English as "thrift (or frugality) is a great revenue (or income)", edited from its original subordinate clause: "O di immortales! non intellegunt homines, quam magnum vectigal sit parsimonia." (English: O immortal gods! Men do not understand what a great revenue is thrift.)
maior e longinquo reverentia	greater reverence from afar	When viewed from a distance, everything is beautiful. Tacitus, Annales 1.47
maior singulis minor universis		(the prince, king, pope) is more than the individual, but less than their totality
maiora premunt	greater things are pressing	Used to indicate that it is the moment to address more important, urgent, issues.
mala fide	in bad faith	Said of an act done with knowledge of its illegality, or with intention to defraud or mislead someone. Opposite of bona fide.
mala ipsa nova	Bad News Itself	Motto of the inactive 495th Fighter Squadron, US Air Force
mala tempora currunt	bad times are upon us	Also used ironically, e.g.: New teachers know all tricks used by pupils to copy from classmates? Oh, mala tempora currunt!.
male captus bene detentus	wrongly captured, properly detained	An illegal arrest will not prejudice the subsequent detention/trial.
malo mori quam foedari	Death rather than dishonour	Motto of the inactive 34th Battalion (Australia), the Drimnagh Castle Secondary School
Malo periculosam libertatem quam quietam servitutem	I prefer dangerous liberty to peaceful slavery	Attributed to the Count Palatine of Posen before the Polish Diet, cited in The Social Contract by Jean-Jacques Rousseau
malum discordiae	apple of discord	Alludes to the apple of Eris in the Judgement of Paris, the mythological cause of the Trojan War.
malum in se	wrong in itself	A legal term meaning that something is prohibited because it is inherently wrong (cf. malum prohibitum); for example, murder.
malum prohibitum	wrong due to being prohibited	A legal term meaning that something is only wrong because it is against the law (cf. malum in se); for example, violating a speed limit.
mandamus	we command	A judicial remedy ordering a lower court, government entity, or public authority to do something (or refrain from doing something) as required by law.
malum quo communius eo peius	the more common an evil is, the worse it is	
manibus date lilia plenis	give lilies with full hands	A phrase from Virgil's Aeneid, VI.883, mourning the death of Marcellus, Augustus' nephew. Quoted by Dante as he leaves Virgil in Purgatory, XXX.21, echoed by Walt Whitman in Leaves of Grass III, 6.
manu forte	literally translated means 'with a strong hand', often quoted as 'by strength of hand'	Motto of the Clan McKay
manu militari	with a military hand	Using armed forces in order to achieve a goal
manu propria (m.p.)	with one's own hand	With the implication of "signed by one's hand". Its abbreviated form is sometimes used at the end of typewritten or printed documents or official notices, directly following the name of the person(s) who "signed" the document exactly in those cases where there isn't an actual handwritten signature.
manus manum lavat	one hand washes the other	famous quote from The Pumpkinification of Claudius, ascribed to Seneca the Younger. It implies that one situation helps the other.
manus multae cor unum	many hands, one heart	Motto of the Alpha Delta Phi fraternity.
manus nigra	black hand	
marcet sine adversario virtus	valor becomes feeble without an opponent	Seneca the Younger, De Providentia 2:4. Also, translated into English as "[their] strength and courage droop without an antagonist" ("Of Providence" (1900) by Seneca, translated by Aubrey Stewart), "without an adversary, prowess shrivels" (Moral Essays (1928) by Seneca, translated by John W, Basore) and "prowess withers without opposition".
mare clausum	closed sea	In law, a sea under the jurisdiction of one nation and closed to all others.
Mare Ditat, Rosa Decorat	The sea enriches, the rose adorns	Motto of Montrose, Angus and HMS Montrose
mare liberum	free sea	In law, a sea open to international shipping navigation.
mare nostrum	our sea	A nickname given to the Mediterranean during the height of the Roman Empire, as it encompassed the entire coastal basin.
Mater Dei	Mother of God	A name given to describe Mary, who gave birth to Jesus, who is also called the Son of God.
mater familias	the mother of the family	The female head of a family. See pater familias.
mater lectionis	mother of reading	a consonant used to represent a vowel in writing systems that lack separate vowel characters, such as Hebrew and Arabic script. Translation of Hebrew: אֵם קְרִיאָה ʾem kəriʾa.
Mater semper certa est	the mother is always certain	A Roman law principle that the mother of a child is always known, as opposed to the father who may not be known. This principle had the power of praesumptio iuris et de iure (literally "presumption of law and by law"), meaning that no counter-evidence can be made against this principle.
materia medica	medical matter	Branch of medical science concerned with the study of drugs used in the treatment of disease. Also, the drugs themselves.
maxima debetur puero reverentia	greatest deference is owed to the child	from Juvenal's Satires XIV:47
me vexat pede	it annoys me at the foot	Less literally, "my foot itches". Refers to a trivial situation or person that is being a bother, possibly in the sense of wishing to kick that thing away or, such as the commonly used expressions, a "pebble in one's shoe" or "nipping at one's heels".
mea culpa	through my fault	Used in Christian prayers and confession to denote the inherently flawed nature of mankind; can also be extended to mea maxima culpa (through my greatest fault).
mea navis aëricumbens anguillis abundat	My hovercraft is full of eels	A relatively common recent Latinization inspired by the Dirty Hungarian Phrasebook sketch by Monty Python.
media vita in morte sumus	In the midst of our lives we die	A well-known sequence, falsely attributed to Notker during the Middle Ages. It was translated by Cranmer and became a part of the burial service in the funeral rites of the Anglican Book of Common Prayer.
Mediolanum captum est	Milan has been captured	Used erroneously as Mediolanum Capta Est by the black metal band Mayhem as an album title. Mediolanum was an ancient city in present-day Milan, Italy.
melius abundare quam deficere	Better too much than not enough	Also used in elliptical form as melius abundare.
meliora	better things	Carrying the connotation of "always better". Motto of the University of Rochester.
meliorare legem meliorare vitam est	To improve the law is to improve life.	Motto of the Salem/Roanoke County, Virginia Bar Association.
meliorem lapsa locavit	He has planted one better than the one fallen.	Motto of the Belmont County, Ohio, and the motto in the seal of the Northwest Territory
mendacem oportet esse memorem	a liar ought to have a good memory	From Quintilian, Institutio Oratoria, book IV, ch. 2, line 91.
memento mori	remember that [you will] die	remember your mortality; medieval Latin based on "memento moriendum esse" in antiquity.
memento vivere	remember to live	
meminerunt omnia amantes	lovers remember all	
memores acti prudentes futuri	mindful of things done, aware of things to come	Thus, both remembering the past and foreseeing the future. From the North Hertfordshire District Council coat of arms.
Memoriae Sacrum (M.S.)	Sacred to the memory (of ...)	A common first line on 17th-century English church monuments. The Latinized name of the deceased follows, in the genitive case. Alternatively it may be used as a heading, the inscription following being in English, for example: "Memoriae Sacrum. Here lies the body of ..."
mens agitat molem	the mind moves the mass	From Virgil; motto of several educational institutions
Mens conscia recti	a mind aware of what is right	Motto of The College Preparatory School in Oakland, California
mens et manus	mind and hand	Motto of Massachusetts Institute of Technology, New York Institute of Technology, and also of the Philadelphia College of Osteopathic Medicine.
mens rea	guilty mind	Also "culprit mind". A term used in discussing the mindset of an accused criminal.
mens sana in corpore sano	a healthy mind in a healthy body	Satire X of the Roman poet Juvenal (10.356); motto of many sporting clubs, military and educational institutions
mente et artificio	with mind and skill	Motto of Toronto Metropolitan University, Canada
metri causa	for the sake of the metre	Excusing flaws in poetry "for the sake of the metre"
Miles Gloriosus	Glorious Soldier	Or "Boastful Soldier". Miles Gloriosus is the title of a play of Plautus. A stock character in comedy, the braggart soldier. (It is said that at Salamanca, there is a wall, on which graduates inscribe their names, where Francisco Franco had a plaque installed reading "Franciscus Francus Miles Gloriosus".)
miles praesidii libertatis	Soldier of the Bastion of Freedom	A phrase on the plaque in commemoration of Prof. Benjamin Marius Telders, Academiegebouw Leiden (Netherlands).
mictus cruentus	bloody urine	see hematuria
minatur innocentibus qui parcit nocentibus	he threatens the innocent who spares the guilty	
minus malum toleratur ut maius tollat	choose the lesser evil so a greater evil may be averted; the lesser of two evils principle	
mirabile dictu	wonderful to tell	Virgil
mirabile visu	wonderful to see	A Roman phrase used to describe a wonderful event/happening.
mirum videtur quod sit factum iam diu	Does it seem wonderful [merely] because it was done a long time/so long ago?	Livius Andronicus, Aiax Mastigophorus.
miscerique probat populos et foedera jungi	He approves of the mingling of the peoples and their bonds of union	Latin Aeneid of Virgil, Book IV, line 112, "he" referring to the great Roman god, who approved of the settlement of Romans in Africa. Old Motto of Trinidad and Tobago, and used in the novel A Bend in the River by V. S. Naipaul.
misera est servitus ubi jus est aut incognitum aut vagum	miserable is that state of slavery in which the law is unknown or uncertain	Quoted by Samuel Johnson in his paper for James Boswell on Vicious intromission.
miserabile visu	terrible to see	A terrible happening or event.
miseram pacem vel bello bene mutari	A bad peace is even worse than war.	From Tacitus' Annales, III, 44.
miserere nobis	have mercy upon us	A phrase within the Gloria in Excelsis Deo and the Agnus Dei, to be used at certain points in Christian religious ceremonies.
Missio Dei	the Mission of God	A theological phrase in the Christian religion.
missit me Dominus	the Lord has sent me	A phrase used by Jesus.
mittimus	we send	A warrant of commitment to prison, or an instruction for a jailer to hold someone in prison.
mobilis in mobili	"moving in a moving thing" or, poetically, "changing through the changing medium"	The motto of the Nautilus from the 1870 Jules Verne novel Twenty Thousand Leagues Under the Seas.
modus operandi (M.O.)	method of operating	Usually used to describe a criminal's methods.
modus ponens	method of placing	Loosely "method of affirming", a logical rule of inference stating that from propositions if P then Q and P, then one can conclude Q.
modus tollens	method of removing	Loosely "method of denying", a logical rule of inference stating that from propositions if P then Q and not Q, then one can conclude not P.
modus vivendi	method of living or way of life	An accommodation between disagreeing parties to allow life to go on. A practical compromise.
Monasterium sine libris est sicut civitas sine opibus	A monastery without books is like a city without wealth	Used in the Umberto Eco novel The Name of the Rose. Part of a much larger phrase: Monasterium sine libris, est sicut civitas sine opibus, castrum sine numeris, coquina sine suppellectili, mensa sine cibis, hortus sine herbis, pratum sine floribus, arbor sine foliis. Translation: A monastery without books is like a city without wealth, a fortress without soldiers, a kitchen without utensils, a table without food, a garden without plants, a meadow without flowers, a tree without leaves.
montani semper liberi	mountaineers [are] always free	State motto of West Virginia, adopted in 1872; part of the coat of arms for the Colombian city of Bucaramanga.
Montis Insignia Calpe	Badge of the Mons Calpe (Rock of Gibraltar)	A self-referential literal identifier below the emblem
morbus virgineus	Disease of the virgins or Virgin's disease	Hypochromic anemia, an iron deficiency anemia common in young women
more ferarum	like beasts	used to describe any sexual act in the manner of beasts
more suo	in his/her/its/their usual way	
morior invictus	I die unvanquished	sometimes also translated as "death before defeat"
morituri nolumus mori	we who are about to die don't want to	From Terry Pratchett's 2001 novel The Last Hero, a parody on morituri te salutant/salutamus
morituri te salutant	those who are about to die salute you	Used once in Suetonius' De Vita Caesarum 5, (Divus Claudius), chapter 21, by the condemned prisoners manning galleys about to take part in a mock naval battle on Lake Fucinus in AD 52. Popular misconception ascribes it as a gladiator's salute. See also: Ave Imperator, morituri te salutant and Naumachia.
mors certa, hora incerta	death is certain, its hour is uncertain	
mors mihi lucrum	death to me is reward	A common epitaph, from St Paul's Epistle to the Philippians, 1:21 (Mihi enim vivere Christus est et mori lucrum, translated in the King James Bible as: "For to me to live is Christ and to die is gain")
mors omnibus	death to all	Signifies anger and depression.
mors tua vita mea	your death, my life	From medieval Latin, it indicates that battle for survival, where your defeat is necessary for my victory, survival.
mors vincit omnia	"death conquers all" or "death always wins"	An axiom often found on headstones; cf. amor vincit omnia
morte magis metuenda senectus	old age should rather be feared than death	from Juvenal in his Satires
mortui vivos docent	The dead teach the living	Used to justify dissections of human cadavers in order to understand the cause of death.
mortuum flagellas	you are flogging a dead (man)	From Gerhard Gerhards' (1466–1536) [better known as Erasmus] collection of annotated Adagia (1508). Criticising one who will not be affected in any way by the criticism.
mos maiorum	the custom of our ancestors	an unwritten code of laws and conduct, of the Romans. It institutionalized cultural traditions, societal mores, and general policies, as distinct from written laws.
motu proprio	on his own initiative	Or "by his own accord." Identifies a class of papal documents, administrative papal bulls.
mulgere hircum	to milk a male goat	From Gerhard Gerhards' (1466–1536) [better known as Erasmus] collection of annotated Adagia (1508). Attempting the impossible.
mulier est hominis confusio	woman is man's ruin	"Part of a comic definition of woman" from the Altercatio Hadriani Augusti et Secundi. Famously quoted by Chauntecleer in Geoffrey Chaucer's Canterbury Tales.
multa paucis	Say much in few words	
multis e gentibus vires	from many peoples, strength	Motto of Saskatchewan
multitudo sapientium sanitas orbis	a multitude of the wise is the health of the world	From the Vulgate, Wisdom of Solomon 6:24. Motto of the University of Victoria.
multum in parvo	much in little	Conciseness. The term "mipmap" is formed using the phrase's abbreviation "MIP"; motto of Rutland, a county in central England. Latin phrases are often multum in parvo, conveying much in few words.
mundus senescit	the world grows old	
mundus vult decipi	the world wants to be deceived	Ascribed to Roman satirist Petronius. Also in Augustine of Hippo's De Civitate Dei contra Paganos (5th century AD), Sebastian Franck's Paradoxa Ducenta Octoginta (1542), and in James Branch Cabell's 1921 novel Figures of Earth.
mundus vult decipi, ergo decipiatur	the world wants to be deceived, so let it be deceived	Ascribed to Roman satirist Petronius. Also in Augustine of Hippo's De Civitate Dei contra Paganos (5th century AD) as "si mundus vult decipi, decipiatur" ("if the world will be gulled, let it be gulled"), and only the first part, "mundus vult decipi" ("the world wants to be deceived"), in Sebastian Franck's Paradoxa Ducenta Octoginta (1542) and in James Branch Cabell's Figures of Earth (1921).
munit haec et altera vincit	this one defends and the other one conquers	Motto of Nova Scotia.
murus aeneus conscientia sana	a wall of brass is a clear conscience	a person with a clear conscience is as strong and impenetrable as a wall made of brass; this phrase is often seen as a family motto, particularly associated with the Earl of Scarbrough and Loder Baronets in England
mutata lex non perit	the law that evolves does not die	Motto of Seneca the Younger
mutatis mutandis	after changing what needed to be changed	"with the appropriate changes"
mutato nomine de te fabula narratur	change but the name, and the story is told of yourself	Horace, Satires, I. 1. 69. Preceded by Quid rides? ("Why do you laugh?"; see Quid rides).
