= Domnei =

Medieval concept of chivalrous devotion to a Lady

Domnei or donnoi is an Old Provençal term meaning the attitude of chivalrous devotion of a knight to his Lady, which was mainly a non-physical and non-marital relationship.

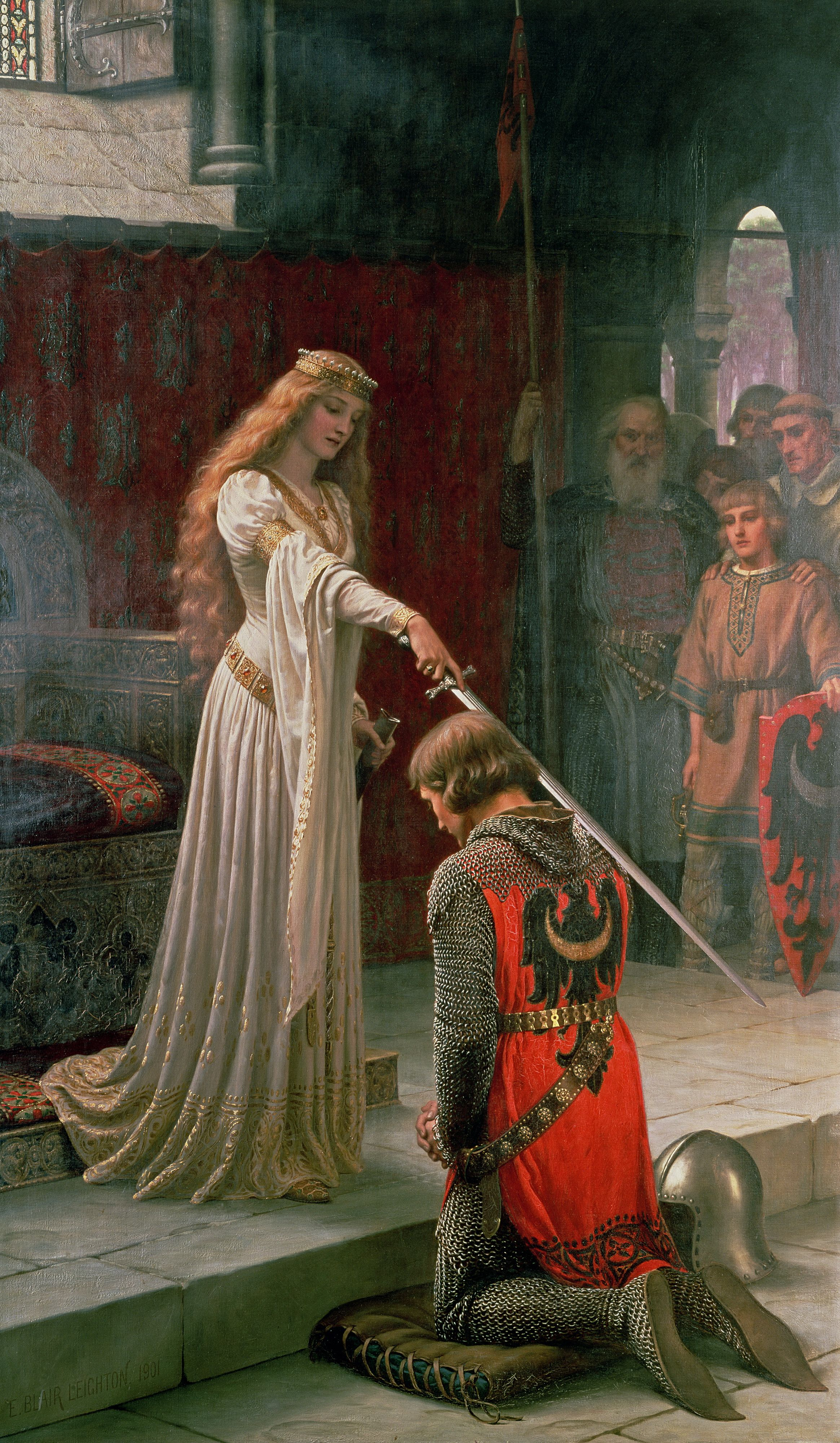
"The Accolade" by Edmund Blair Leighton, painted in 1901, clearly expresses the concept of Domnei

== Principles ==
This type of relationship was highly ritualized and complex but was generally considered to be non-physical. In discussing the history of Provençal poetry (Occitan literature), Claude Charles Fauriel asserts: "He who wants to fully possess his lady knows nothing of 'donnoi'." Guilhem de Montanhagol (1233–1268), a Provençal troubadour, declared: "E d'amor mou castitaz", or, "From love comes chastity".

The chevalier's devotion to his lady functioned by his servitude to her both in terms of his code of conduct and courtly duties. Chivalry as a code, as indicated by the concepts of courtly love and the quality of Domnei, necessitated in theory as in practice a level of devotion to the lady, or high mistress, that went beyond mere professionalism and graciousness in etiquette. Truth and honesty were core virtues, and therefore, a knight's actions were to stem from honorable intentions, sincere motives, and purity of heart. Therefore, in matters of the heart, courtly love wasn't always plausibly separable or indistinguishable from romantic love.

However, by Eros, by Cupid's arrow, the object of a knight's affections may have resided elsewhere outside of his formal duties to his lady. In some instances, the lady was chosen, as in assigned to a knight by happenstance, whereby direct interaction may have been unlikely. As a princesse lointaine, she may have lived in a far away castle by which the chevalier could never, and would never have the chance to know her. Despite the confines of romantic impossibility, obligations of courtly love and Domnei were to persevere out of a chivalrous sense of loyalty and devotion for a knight to his lady. Realities as they were, such as unrequited love as an example, often provided the basis for contributing to many tales of love and legend in medieval literature and medieval poetry.

== Other modern usage ==
=== The Cabell book ===
In modern times, the term "Domnei" is especially known for its usage in the title and plot of Domnei: A Comedy of Woman-Worship, a 1913 fantasy novel by James Branch Cabell, which is set in the imaginary French province of Poictesme during the second half of the thirteenth century.

=== The Gallico book ===
In Paul Gallico's novel Adventures of Hiram Holliday the protagonist is a twentieth century American consciously seeking to model himself on the Medieval knights of romantic literature and to live by the Code of Chivalry in modern society. Domnei-style woman-worship is offered to an exiled Habsburg princess whom he saves from Nazi agents and with whom he falls in love.
