= Domnei: A Comedy of Woman-Worship =

1913 novel by James Branch Cabell

Domnei
- Author: James Branch Cabell
- Original title: The Soul of Melicent
- Illustrator: Howard Pyle
- Language: English
- Series: Biography of the Life of Manuel
- Genre: Fantasy novel
- Publisher: Frederick A. Stokes
- Publication date: 1913
- Publication place: United States
- Media type: Print (hardcover)
- Pages: 216 pp
- Preceded by: The Silver Stallion
- Followed by: The Music from Behind the Moon

Domnei: A Comedy of Woman-Worship (1913) is a fantasy novel by James Branch Cabell, set in the imaginary French province of Poictesme during the second half of the 13th century. (Note: Cabell fixed the period covered by the novel as August 1256 to July 1274. See James Branch Cabell The Cream of the Jest, The Lineage of Lichfield: Two Comedies of Evasion (London: Pan/Ballantine, 1972) p. 265.)

It forms the fifth volume of Cabell's gigantic Biography of the Life of Manuel, and tells the story of Dom Manuel's daughter Melicent, and of the disastrous struggle between her successive husbands Demetrios of Anatolia and Perion de la Forêt. Carl Van Doren characterised the book as "Mr. Cabell's highest flight in the representation of the extravagant woman-worship developed out of the chivalric code", and as being "unified and dramatic beyond any other of the Cabell novels".

Domnei was written during the years 1910 to 1912, the story being inspired by various illustrations by Howard Pyle which Cabell had cut out of old numbers of Harper's Magazine. The manuscript was sent to no less than twelve publishers before finally being accepted by the thirteenth, Frederick A. Stokes, on the advice of Sinclair Lewis who was then working as a reader for them. Cabell had always intended the novel to appear as Domnei, but the publisher insisted on the less recondite title The Soul of Melicent. Despite this precaution, and the presence of the Howard Pyle illustrations, the book sold only 493 copies.

In 1920 it was republished by Robert M. McBride in a revised edition with an introduction by Joseph Hergesheimer; this, like all subsequent editions, used the title Domnei. The book was further revised in 1926 and 1928, and appeared in an edition illustrated by Frank C. Papé in 1930. In 1972 Domnei and Cabell's The Music from Behind the Moon were published together in paperback as the 44th volume of the Ballantine Adult Fantasy series, with an introduction by Lin Carter.

== See also ==
- Domnei
