= Interval =

Interval may refer to:

== Mathematics and physics ==
- Interval (mathematics), a range of numbers
  - Partially ordered set#Intervals, its generalization from numbers to arbitrary partially ordered sets
- A statistical level of measurement
- Interval estimate
- Interval (graph theory)
- Space-time interval, the distance between two points in 4-space

== Arts and entertainment ==
=== Dramatic arts ===
- Intermission, (British English: interval), a break in a theatrical performance
  - Entr'acte, a French term for the same, but used in English often to mean a musical performance played during the break
- Interval (play), a 1939 play by Sumner Locke Elliott
- Interval (1973 film), a 1973 film starring Merle Oberon
- Interval (2025 film), a 2025 film starring Shashi Raj

=== Music ===
- Interval (music), the relationship in pitch between two notes
- Intervals (band), a Canadian progressive metal band
- Intervals (See You Next Tuesday album), 2008
- Intervals (Ahmad Jamal album), 1980

== Sport ==
- Playing time (cricket)#Intervals, the breaks between play in cricket
- Interval training, a training technique used by runners and cyclists

== Other uses ==
- Interval Research Corporation, a technology think tank founded by Paul Allen
- Recess (break), a break between classes, also called "interval" in New Zealand
- Jerry Interval (1923–2006), American portrait photographer and educator

== See also ==
- Intermission (disambiguation)
- InterVol, a UK volunteering charity
- Interval scheduling, a class of problems in computer science
