= Biography of the Life of Manuel =

Literary cycle by James Branch Cabell

Biography of the Life of Manuel is a series of novels, essays and poetry by James Branch Cabell. It purports to trace the life, illusions and disillusions of Dom Manuel, Count of Poictesme (a fictional province of France), and of his physical and spiritual descendants through many generations.

== Theme ==
The conceit of the series is that the life (or at least the expectations) of Dom Manuel 'the Redeemer', which is the subject of the novel Figures of Earth, did not end in his death but was continued in his heirs. The life of each follows the same pattern.

The comedy is always the same. In the first act, the hero imagines a place where happiness exists. In the second, he strives towards that goal. In the third, he comes up short, or what amounts to the same thing: he achieves his goal only to find that happiness lies a little further down the road.

--The High Place : A Comedy of Disenchantment (1923)

== Sequence ==
The components of the Biography were written between 1901 and 1929; some of them were originally conceived before Cabell had thought of Manuel and had to be rewritten to a greater or lesser extent to enable them to fit into the sequence. Although the Biography is a mix of fantasies, historical romances, social satires, verse, plays, and essays, Cabell said that he considered it a single work.

== Bibliography ==
A table of works comprising the Biography follows. These data are given for each title:

- the date of its first publication, and of its revision (if any);
- an 'S' number (thus: S01) representing the volume of the uniform Storisende Edition, prepared under Cabell's supervision, published by R. M. McBride in 18 volumes between 1927 and 1930 (an asterisk indicates that the listed work formed only part of the volume);
- a 'B' number (thus: B15) representing the number of the work in the official bibliography of Cabell, prepared with his assistance by F. J. Brewer in 1957.

Title	Published	Index (Storisende)	Index (Bibliography)	Description
Beyond Life	1919	S01	B01	Essentially a non-fiction essay on life and fiction-writing.
Figures of Earth	1921	S02	B02	The tale of the rise of Dom Manuel himself from swineherd to count.
The Silver Stallion	1926	S03	B03	The story of the Lords of the Silver Stallion, Manuel's court, after his death.
Domnei: A Comedy of Woman-Worship	1913 as The Soul of Melicent; revised and retitled 1920	S04*	B05	
The Music From Behind the Moon	1926	S04*	B45	
Chivalry	1909, revised 1921	S05	B06	The 1909 edition had no references to Manuel.
Jurgen, A Comedy of Justice	1919	S06	B07	Cabell's most famous book, chronicling the fantastical adventures of the pawnbroker and "monstrous clever fellow" Jurgen.
The Line of Love	1905, revised 1921	S07	B08	
The High Place	1923	S08	B09	
Gallantry	1907, revised 1922	S09	B10	The 1907 edition had no references to Manuel or Jurgen.
Something About Eve	1927	S10	B11	Manuel's and Jurgen's descendant, the magician Gerald Musgrave, journeys towards the destination of gods and poets but finds other ends.
The Certain Hour	1916	S11	B12	
The Cords of Vanity	1909, revised 1920	S12	B13	
From the Hidden Way	1916, revised 1924; 1928 as Ballads from the Hidden Way	S13*	B14	Verse
The Jewel Merchants	1921	S13*	B15	Play
The Rivet in Grandfather's Neck	1915	S14	B16	
The Eagle's Shadow	1904, revised 1923	S15	B17	
The Cream of the Jest	1917, revised 1922	S16*	B18	
The Lineage of Lichfield	1922	S16*	B19	A fantastic genealogy of the Biography.
Straws and Prayer-Books	1924	S17	B20	Essays, plus two fantasy stories.
Townsend of Lichfield	1930	S18	B21	Essays, stories, verses and bibliography.
Taboo	1921	S18*	B44	A thinly veiled fantasy-style recounting of the Jurgen obscenity trial.
Sonnets from Antan	1929	S18*	B49	Verse
The Witch-Woman	1948	-	B04	Compiles three related books: The Music From Behind the Moon (1926; S04*, B45), The Way of Ecben (1929; S18*, B48), and The White Robe (1928; S18*, B47), plus a new introduction. Not in the Storisende Edition.
Preface to the Past	1936	-	B22	Prefaces and notes extracted from the Storisende Edition.
The Judging of Jurgen	1920	-	B42	Like Taboo, a parody of the proceedings against Jurgen.

Some of Cabell's other books appear to have teasing references to the Biography. For example, the hero of Hamlet Had an Uncle (1927, B27) is the historical prince Horwendill, whose name suggests Manuel's nemesis, Horvendile.
