= The Silver Stallion =

1926 novel by James Branch Cabell

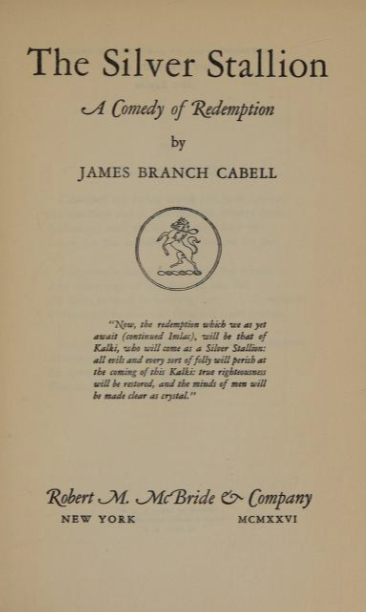
- Title page for The Silver Stallion: A Comedy of Redemption (1926)
- Author: James Branch Cabell
- Language: English
- Series: Biography of the Life of Manuel
- Genre: Fantasy
- Publisher: Robert M. McBride
- Publication date: 1926
- Publication place: United States
- Media type: Print (Hardback)
- Pages: 358
- Preceded by: Figures of Earth
- Followed by: Domnei: A Comedy of Woman-Worship

The Silver Stallion: A Comedy of Redemption is a novel by American writer James Branch Cabell that was published in 1926 as part of his Biography of the Life of Manuel series.

== Publication history ==
The Silver Stallion is part of the Biography of the Life of Manuel series.

== Reception ==
Dave Langford reviewed The Silver Stallion for White Dwarf #49, and stated that "The Silver Stallion stands up well on its own: moving, erudite and very, very witty. [...] This and Jurgen are the best introductions to Cabell."

== Reviews ==
- Review by James Blish (1969) in Science Fiction Review, October 1969
- Review by Charles N. Brown [as by Charlie Brown] (1969) in Locus, #42 November 21, 1969
- Review by Robert A. W. Lowndes [as by RAWL] (1969) in Bizarre Fantasy Tales, Fall 1970 No. 1, (1970)
- Review by James Blish (1970) in The Magazine of Fantasy and Science Fiction, February 1970
- Review by James Blish (1972) in Shadow, March 1972
- Review by David Conway (I) (1972) in Vector 59 Spring 1972
- Review by Everett F. Bleiler (1983) in The Guide to Supernatural Fiction
