= Figures of Earth =

Novel by James Branch Cabell

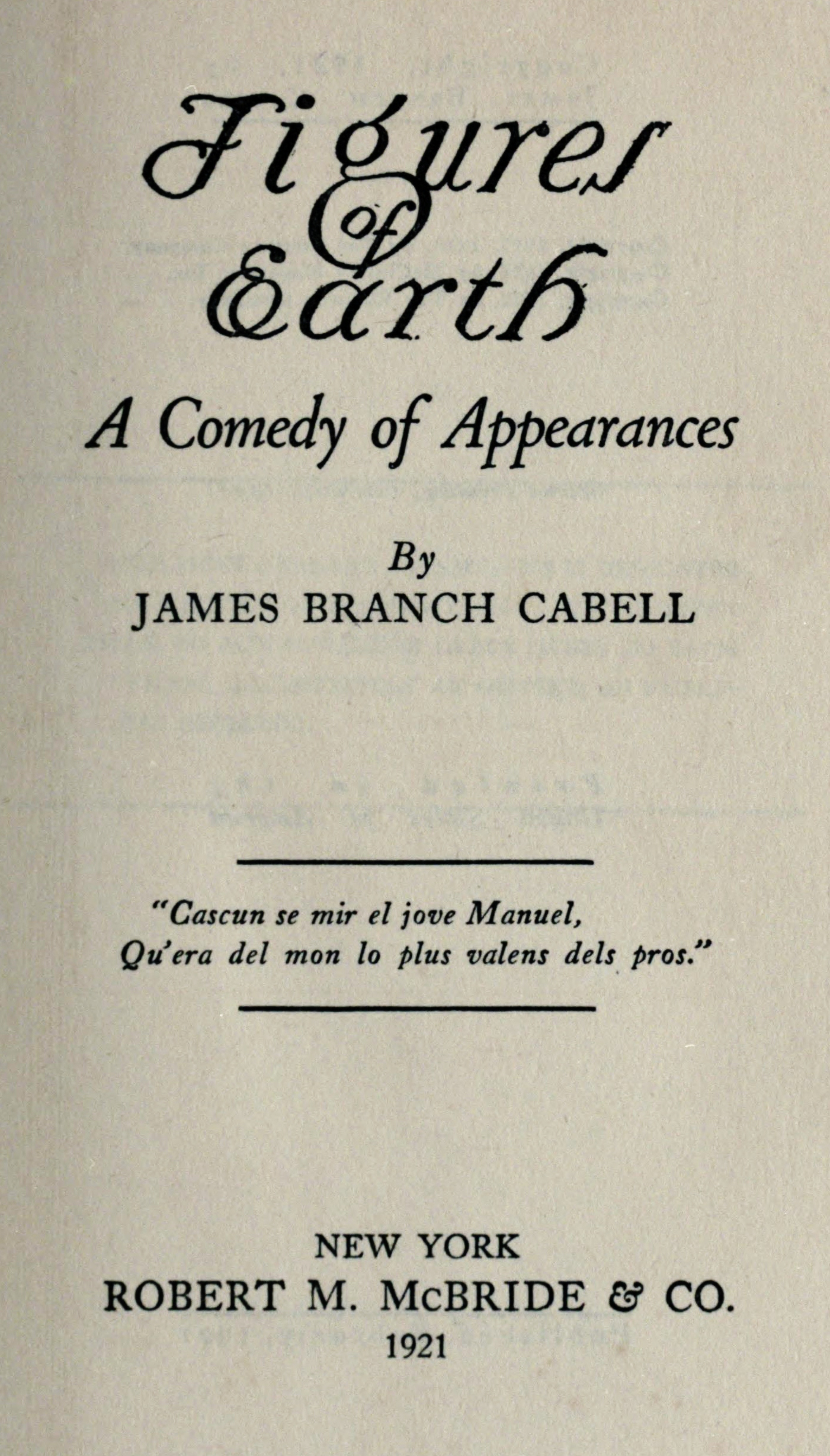
- First edition title page
- Author: James Branch Cabell
- Language: English
- Series: Biography of the Life of Manuel
- Genre: Fantasy
- Publisher: Robert M. McBride
- Publication date: 1921
- Publication place: United States
- Media type: Print (Hardback)
- Pages: 356
- Preceded by: Beyond Life
- Followed by: The Silver Stallion

Figures of Earth: A Comedy of Appearances (1921) is a fantasy novel or ironic romance by James Branch Cabell, set in the imaginary French province of Poictesme during the first half of the 13th century. The book follows the earthly career of Dom Manuel the Redeemer from his origins as a swineherd, through his elevation to the rank of Count of Poictesme, to his death. It forms the second volume of Cabell's gigantic Biography of the Life of Manuel.

Cabell's working title for Figures of Earth was initially The Fairy Time, then The Figure or The Figures, before the final version emerged. The book was published in February 1921, during the legal battle to clear his previous novel, Jurgen, from charges of obscenity. He accordingly dedicated Figures of Earth to "six most gallant champions" who had rallied to Jurgen's defense: Sinclair Lewis, Wilson Follett, Louis Untermeyer, H. L. Mencken, Hugh Walpole, and Joseph Hergesheimer. The scandal that surrounded Cabell's name at this time may have adversely affected reviews of Figures of Earth, which, according to the author, registered "some disappointment over its lack of indecency"; he himself preferred Figures of Earth to Jurgen. In the "Author's Note" preceding the novel's 1927 reprint, Cabell observed that "Not many other volumes, I believe, have been burlesqued and cried down in the public prints by their own dedicatees" alluding to the fact that both Untermeyer and Mencken had publicly expressed dislike with the novel in comparison with Jurgen. A 1925 reissue included illustrations by Frank C. Papé. In Cabell's later years Figures of Earth fell, like most of his other works, into comparative neglect, but two paperback reissues in 1969 and 1971, with introductions by Lin Carter and James Blish respectively, brought it back into circulation.

== Reception ==
The New York Times, reviewing Figures of Earth, declared that "This new novel is, very much of it, beautifully written. Its characters share with the majority of his creations the curiously unhuman quality which is never more apparent than when he is trying to make them quite commonplace. . . . It is a curious, often very beautiful, and at the bottom very sad book."

On Cabell's death in 1958, Edmund Wilson wrote "the more I have thought about Figures of Earth -- and its sequel The Silver Stallion -- the more remarkable they have come to seem. . . . [T]he chronicle of Manuel the Redeemer was not a book for the Young nor was it a book in the mood of the twenties. The story of the ambitious man of action who is cowardly, malignant and treacherous and who does not even enjoy very much what his crimes and double-dealing have won him, but who is rapidly, after his death, transformed into a great leader, a public benefactor and a saint, has the fatal disadvantage for a novel that the reader finds no inducement to identify himself with its central figure. Yet I am now not sure that this merciless chronicle in which all the values are negative except the naked human will, is not one of the best things of its kind in literature -- on a plane, perhaps, with Flaubert and Swift."

E. F. Bleiler noted that while the novel's storyline was "meandering", it included "entertaining diversions on symbolically disguised book reviewers, philistines and their sexual obtusities, and pseudo-mythology." He concluded that "As a totality, [it is] repetitive, nagging, and boring, but with excellent moments."

Anticipating its 1969 Ballantine reissue, James Blish wrote that "the effect of this heroic fantasy is rather anti-romantic despite its materials, an effect reinforced by Cabell's style." David Langford, in The Encyclopedia of Fantasy, comments that "We are not admitted to any of [the protagonist's] thoughts, giving the book a chilly aspect despite fine poetic passages."
