= 1938 New York gubernatorial election =

- November 6, 1938
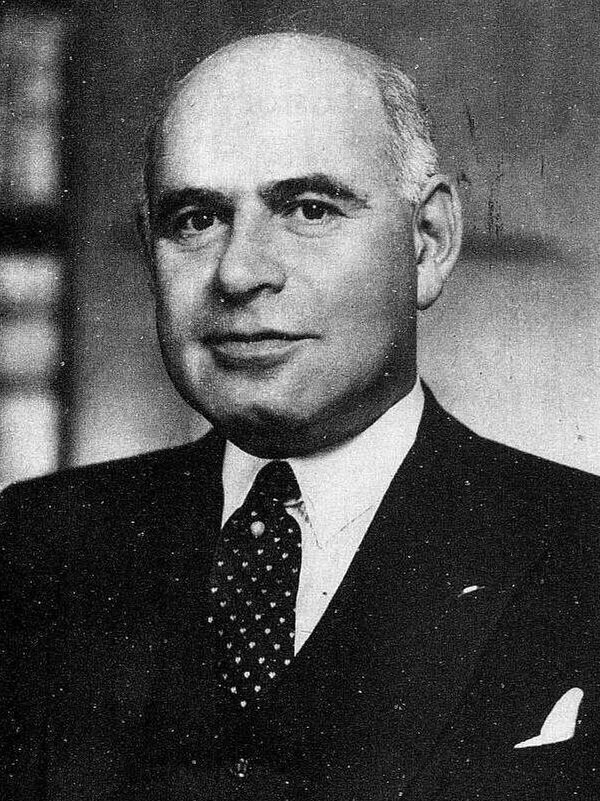

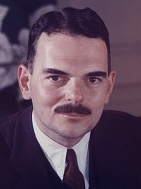
Nominee	Herbert H. Lehman	Thomas E. Dewey
Party	Democratic	Republican
Alliance	American Labor	Independent Progressive
Popular vote	2,391,286	2,326,892
Percentage	49.59%	48.26%
- County results Lehman: 50–60% 60–70% 70–80% Dewey: 50–60% 60–70% 70–80%
Governor before election
Herbert H. Lehman
Democratic
Elected Governor
Herbert H. Lehman
Democratic

The 1938 New York gubernatorial election was held on November 8, 1938. Incumbent Governor Herbert H. Lehman was narrowly re-elected to a fourth term in office over Manhattan District Attorney Thomas E. Dewey. Despite Dewey's defeat, the close race with Lehman elevated him to further prominence, positioning him as an early contender for the 1940 Republican presidential nomination.

The 1938 election was the first election where the Governor of New York was elected to a four-year term, rather than a two-year term.

== Background ==
Entering the 1938 campaign, the Democratic Party had elected three successive governors, Al Smith, Franklin D. Roosevelt and Herbert H. Lehman, continuously holding the office since 1918, with the exception of the two-year term of Republican Nathan Miller from 1921–23. Lehman, who was first elected in 1932 had won three terms by landslide margins as the Great Depression badly damaged Republican support in New York and many urban centers throughout the United States.

One bright spot in the New York Republican Party was Thomas E. Dewey, a young Manhattan special prosecutor appointed by Lehman who had won national fame as a "gangbuster" for his successful arrests and prosecutions of organized crime figures, including Lucky Luciano and Lepke Buchalter. His 1938 prosecution of former New York Stock Exchange president Richard Whitney for embezzlement also won him the support of financial reformers, raising him to the status of authentic national hero.

Dewey began laying the groundwork for a statewide campaign as early as summer 1936, when he met with Nassau County political boss J. Russell Sprague at the Long Island estate of Henry Root Stern, an attorney and treasurer of the state Republican Party. Sprague, who had led the New York delegation at that year's Republican National Convention. Following Robert Moses's disastrous performance in the 1934 election, Sprague was one of a coterie of young Republican leaders who sought to reform the party, including Edwin Jaeckle of Buffalo, W. Kingsland Macy of Suffolk County, and Kenneth Simpson of Manhattan. Dewey and Sprague discussed political affairs but made no firm promises.

=== 1937 Manhattan district attorney election ===
In 1937, Samuel Seabury and other city reformers, including mayor Fiorello La Guardia and Adolf Berle, recruited Dewey to run for Manhattan District Attorney on a cross-party fusion ticket. Dewey had little interest in the position and repeatedly declined their nomination or placed grandiose conditions on acceptance, having already accepted a lucrative offer from John Foster Dulles to join his law firm, Sullivan & Cromwell. Nevertheless, supporters submitted his name and pressured him to join; shortly before the filing deadline, Dewey assented, under pressure to show that he was not, in his words, "a skunk [who] wouldn't run for an office I didn't want".

Despite his initial reluctance, Dewey ran an aggressive and successful campaign. Starting as the distinct underdog in the overwhelmingly Democratic borough, he narrowed the odds to 6-to-5 by late September. Throughout October, Dewey hosted Sunday night radio talks where he recounted the details of his prosecutions. The addresses were wildly popular, and Dewey was ultimately elected by a margin of over 100,000 votes over the Tammany Hall candidate, greater than La Guardia's margin of victory in the borough.

== Republican nomination ==
=== Candidates ===
- Thomas E. Dewey, District Attorney of New York County

==== Declined ====
- George U. Harvey, Queens Borough President

=== Campaign ===
Having established a reputation as a popular prosecutor and successful campaigner, Dewey was the early front-runner for the Republican nomination in 1938, encouraged by national Republican leadership. Some political observers even suggested that he was a likely candidate for the presidency in 1940. His political fortunes suffered a setback in the summer when judge Ferdinand Pecora declared a mistrial in his prosecution of Tammany Hall leader James Joseph Hines, but the Republican Party remained solidly behind him. (A second trial, with Charles Cooper Nott Jr. presiding, resulted in Hines's conviction on thirteen counts.)

Ahead of the convention, Dewey ally George Z. Medalie oversaw a revision of the proposed party platform, liberalizing several provisions to better suit Dewey's campaign. As a result, Queens Borough President George U. Harvey, who believed Medalie would turn the party over to "the Communists", threatened to run an independent conservative campaign.

=== Results ===
The Republican state convention met on September 29 and nominated Dewey unanimously. In his acceptance speech, Dewey called for a new progressive Republican movement in the vein of former governors Theodore Roosevelt and Charles Evans Hughes and criticized obstructionism within his own party. Avoiding referencing Lehman, who had not yet agreed to run, by name, he charged, "any Democratic governor is, perforce, the good-will advertising, the front man, the window dressing for what is, in part at least, a thoroughly corrupt machine." Radio reports of his speech were interrupted by news of the Munich Agreement.

== Democratic nomination ==
=== Candidates ===
- Herbert H. Lehman, incumbent Governor since 1933 (draft)

==== Declined ====
- Ferdinand Pecora, justice of the New York Supreme Court and chief counsel to the United States Senate Committee on Banking and Currency

=== Campaign ===
Early indications suggested that Lehman had determined not to run for re-election to a fourth term, even before he was elected to a third. In July 1935, he invited judge Ferdinand Pecora, who had won fame for United States Senate investigations into Wall Street corruption, to lead a state grand jury indictment for racketeering, implicitly challenging Dewey's position as the face of criminal law in New York City. Pecora, who had run for District Attorney himself in 1933, was talked about as a potential successor to Lehman.

Lehman initially intended to run for U.S. Senate, but under mounting pressure from his party to stave off the popular Dewey, he ultimately gave in to a draft effort on his behalf. The draft was led by James A. Farley, acting on behalf of President Roosevelt, who feared that a Dewey victory would jeopardize the state's support for the New Deal and Roosevelt's potential re-election to a third term. On September 30, Lehman announced that he would run again.

=== Results ===
The Democratic state convention met on October 1. Despite Lehman's pleas that he was not a candidate for nomination, he was successfully drafted as the nominee for a fourth term.

The American Labor state convention met on October 3 at the Manhattan Opera House in New York City and nominated Lehman for governor.

== General election ==
=== Candidates ===
- Thomas E. Dewey, District Attorney of New York County (Republican and Independent Progressive)
- Herbert H. Lehman, incumbent Governor since 1933 (Democratic and American Labor)
- Aaron M. Orange (Industrial Government)
- Norman Thomas, Presbyterian minister and perennial candidate (Socialist)

==== Declined ====
- George U. Harvey, Queens Borough President (Independent Republican)

The Socialist Party state convention met on October 1, and nominated again Norman Thomas for governor. The Socialist Labor Party changed its name to the "Industrial Government Party" and filed a petition to nominate Aaron M. Orange.

Following the American Labor nomination of Lehman, the Independent Progressive Party filed a petition to nominate a ticket led by Dewey, giving him a second ballot line to match Lehman.

=== Campaign ===
The Dewey campaign was among the first to make use of scientific political polling through a young George Gallup, whom Dewey befriended and cited as authoritative.

Dewey ran an active campaign in October and November, mirroring his efforts in the 1937 race for District Attorney. He centered his message on state government competence and the power wielded by urban bosses outside Manhattan, such as Ed Flynn of the Bronx and Daniel O'Connell of Albany. Rather than a traditional motorcar campaign through rural counties, Dewey utilized radio broadcasts in which he sought to address questions on his command of issues beyond crime. In his first broadcast, Dewey criticized Lehman directly for his management of state unemployment insurance and the supply of housing in the state. Other issues included civil service reform, public health, and electric rates. Seeking to gain independent and Democratic support, he openly referred to himself as a "New Deal Republican" and criticized Lehman as nothing more than "a branch manager in a chain store system of national politics." Oddsmakers revised Lehman's 4-to-1 lead down to 8-to-5 by mid-October, leaving the Dewey campaign optimistic of an upset.

Despite these efforts, Dewey faced the challenge of unseating a popular incumbent with a personal reputation for sterling integrity. Several times in during the campaign, he walked back harsher criticisms of Lehman to avoid self-destructive guilt by association. Dewey also had the difficulty of balancing his criticisms of Democratic Party bosses with his own reliance on Republican machines in Buffalo and Long Island.

Lehman had the support of the American Labor Party, most unions, and the Communist Party, and took a backseat in his own campaign, which was guided from Washington by President Roosevelt and his advisors. Roosevelt advised an approach which conceded Dewey's evident popularity, urging, "The best line that can be circulated in upstate New York, especially among Republican or Independent voters, is 'I propose to vote for Dewey—to continue as District Attorney for the balance of his term.'" In a late effort to swing the large Jewish bloc in New York City, Roosevelt spoke obliquely of an anti-Semitic "whispering campaign", and Lehman seized on local Republican posters urging citizens to "Vote the American Way."

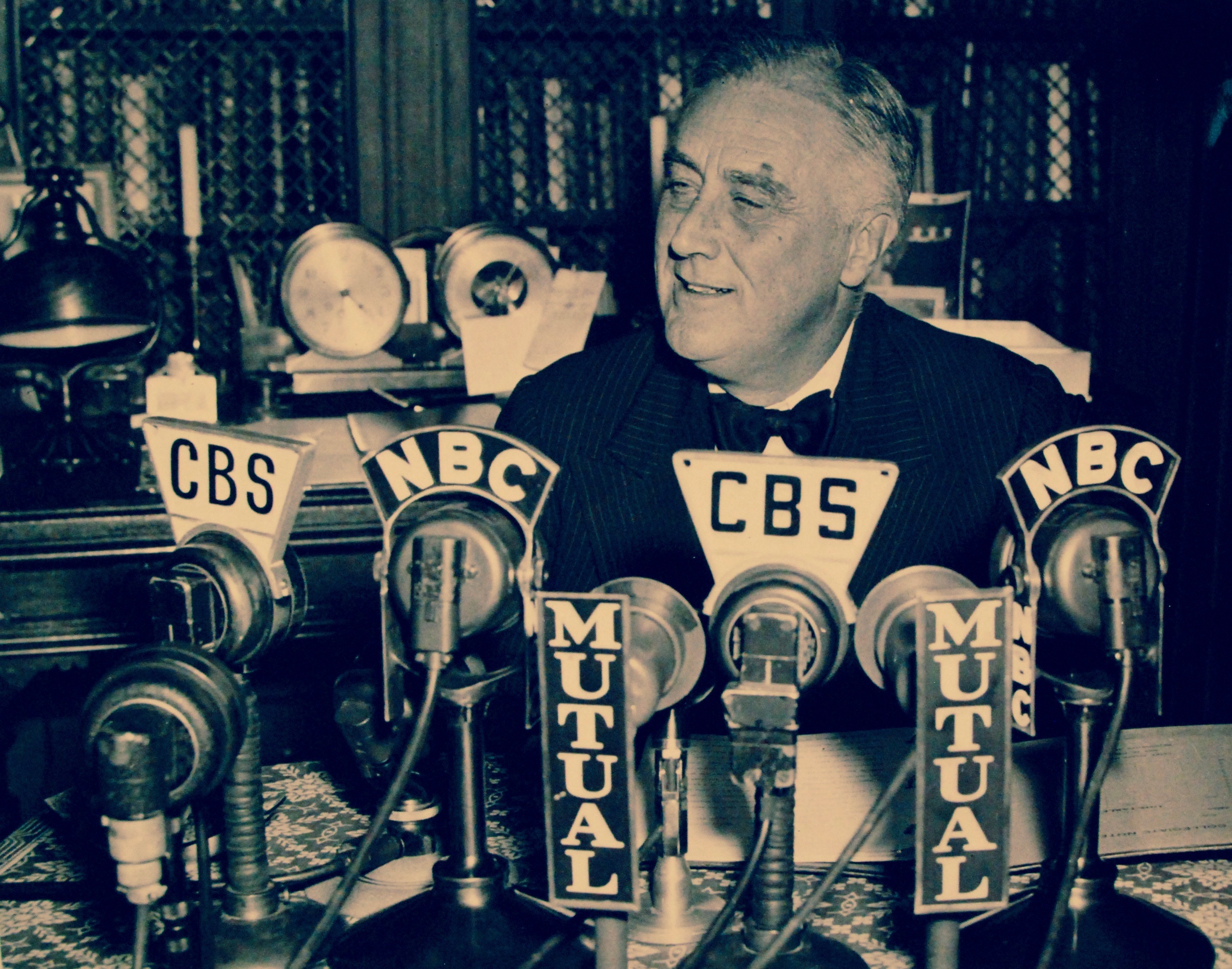
In his November 4 address to the nation, President Franklin D. Roosevelt endorsed Lehman and harshly criticized Dewey and the Republican Party.

On November 4, two days before the election, Roosevelt publicly endorsed Lehman and launched his final attack, criticizing Dewey as "yet to win his spurs" and comparing "old-time Republicans" to fascists and communists as a threat to democracy. Adapting Matthew 7:16, Roosevelt suggested that Dewey was a front for more insidious purposes: "By their promoters ye shall know them." Dewey responded at his closing rally, saying, "I stand before you accused of one crime—I was born in the twentieth century. To that I plead guilty. I am of the twentieth century. We look forward, not backward." Addressing the claim that he should be judged by his supporters, Dewey attacked the ties between the Democratic machine and organized crime, displaying a sheriff's commission given by Ed Flynn to mobster Dutch Schultz for the audience.

=== Polling ===
Poll source	Date published	Margin of error	Thomas Dewey	Herbert Lehman
American Institute of Public Opinion	November 3, 1938	±3.0%	49.5%	50.5%
American Institute of Public Opinion	November 6, 1938	±3.0%	49.8%	50.2%

=== Results ===
The initial vote count was extremely close, but by midnight, Lehman clung to a 70,000 vote lead with only a handful of districts remaining. Dewey's 620,000-vote margin in upstate New York eclipsed even that of Herbert Hoover in 1928, and he lost only Albany County.

Lehman was only able to win reelection due to the votes he received on the American Labor ballot line. Dewey received more votes on the Republican ballot line than Lehman had on the Democratic ballot line.

1938 New York gubernatorial election
Party	Candidate	Votes	%	±%
Democratic	Herbert H. Lehman	1,971,307	40.88%	▼7.98
American Labor	Herbert H. Lehman	419,979	8.71%	▲3.98
Total	Herbert H. Lehman	2,391,286	49.59%	▼4.00
Republican	Thomas E. Dewey	2,302,505	47.75%	▲3.55
Ind. Progressive	Thomas E. Dewey	24,387	0.51%	N/A
Total	Thomas E. Dewey	2,326,892	48.26%	N/A
Socialist	Norman Thomas	24,980	0.52%	▼1.05
Industrial Government	Aaron M. Orange	3,516	0.07%	N/A
Write-in		75,047	1.56%	
Total votes		4,821,721	100.00%	

== Aftermath ==
Dewey's narrow defeat in the 1938 election nevertheless immediately established him as the leader of the New York Republican Party and front-runner for the 1940 Republican presidential nomination; William Allen White compared the loss to Abraham Lincoln's defeat in the 1858 Senate election against Stephen Douglass. He quickly put together a campaign, but was ultimately defeated at the convention by a late surge of support for Wendell Willkie.

Lehman opted not to stand for re-election in 1942 and was succeeded as governor by Dewey. Dewey went on to win the presidential nomination in 1944, losing to Roosevelt, and again in 1948, losing to Harry S. Truman in an historic upset.

== Sources ==
- Smith, Richard Norton (1982). Thomas Dewey and His Times. New York: Simon and Schuster.

== See also ==
- New York gubernatorial elections
- New York state elections
