= The Cream of the Jest =

Novel by James Branch Cabell

The Cream of the Jest: A Comedy of Evasions
- Cover of first edition
- Author: James Branch Cabell
- Language: English
- Series: Biography of the Life of Manuel
- Genre: Literary fiction
- Publisher: Robert M. McBride & Company
- Publication date: 1917
- Publication place: United States
- Media type: Print (Hardback)
- Pages: xv, 280 pp
- Preceded by: The Eagle's Shadow
- Followed by: The Lineage of Lichfield

The Cream of the Jest : A Comedy of Evasions is a comical and philosophical novel with possible fantasy elements, by James Branch Cabell, published in 1917. Much of it consists of the historical dreams and philosophical reflections of the main character, the famous writer Felix Kennaston. An early reviewer said it was more a series of essays than a novel.

== Plot introduction ==
The novel takes place almost entirely around Lichfield, Virginia, Cabell's fictionalization of Richmond, Virginia, particularly in Kennaston's house, in the country. However, Kennaston's dreams take place in various parts of Europe and the Mediterranean basin at various times in the past. Also, part of The Cream of the Jest consists of the ending of the first version of Kennaston's novel, which is set in the Middle Ages around the castle of Storisende in a mythical country.

The time covers a few years, apparently not long before the novel's publication in 1917.

== Plot summary ==
The book begins with a chapter in which Richard Harrowby, a Virginian cosmetics manufacturer, promises to explain the sudden appearance of "genius" in his late neighbor, Felix Kennaston. His story will be based on his notes from a conversation with Kennaston.

There follow the last six chapters of Kennaston's first draft. A clerk named Horvendile is in love with the heroine, Ettare, but sees her as the ideal woman who is in all desired women, not someone he can love with the disappointments of living with a flesh-and-blood person. He brings about the climactic confrontation between hero and villain. After the hero wins, Horvendile reveals to him and Ettare that they are characters in a book and that he is the Author's stand-in. He must return to his own, prosaic country. As safe-conduct back to Storisende, Ettare gives him half of a talisman she wears, the Sigil of Scoteia.

Having composed this while walking in his garden, Kennaston realizes he has dropped a piece of lead: a broken half of a disk inscribed with indecipherable characters. He surmises he was unconsciously inspired by it to invent the sigil. That night he falls asleep looking at the gleaming metal and has a lucid dream of Ettare, who is also aware that she is dreaming. When he touches her, he wakes up.

Kennaston writes a new ending for his novel. After a reviewer condemns it as indecent, it becomes a bestseller.

When Kennaston sleeps facing light reflected from the mysterious sigil, he dreams that he as Horvendile meets Ettare in various times and places, but she is always untouchable. (He can set up the reflections conveniently because he sleeps in a separate room from his wife; their relations had long been friendly but mutually uncomprehending.) Fascinated by the sigil and mysterious clues he receives, by his dreams, and by the ironic philosophical speculations they lead him to, he loses interest in ordinary life apart from his next book.

Just before that book is published, he enters his wife's dressing room in her absence and finds the other half of the sigil. He concludes that she was Ettare all along, and he remembers his former love for her. However, she ignores his tentative affection, and her only comment when he shows her the sigil is that their neighbor Harrowby might know something about it. She throws both pieces away. Without the inspiration of his dreams, Kennaston largely stops writing.

His wife dies. As Harrowby is interested in the occult, Kennaston follows his wife's hint by showing him the sigil (found in her dressing room) and telling him about the dreams. Harrowby recognizes it as the mock-antique lid of his company's brand of cold cream. He does not disillusion Kennaston, but "gently" raises the possibility that the sigil might not be miraculous. Kennaston scornfully replies that such a possibility would not change what the sigil taught him: everything in life is miraculous.

Cabell himself drew the book's image of the sigil, which looks like writing in a strange alphabet. When turned upside-down, it reads, "James Branch Cabell made this book so that he who wills may read the story of man's eternally unsatisfied hunger in search of beauty. Ettare stays inaccessible always and her loveliness is his to look on only in his dreams".

== Reception ==
According to Edmund Wilson, The Cream of the Jest achieved "critical success". A review in the New York Times of the first publication called the book "interesting and something more than entertaining", though not for the "prosaic" or the "literal-minded". It was "one of those books which make one feel that it was written because the author more than enjoyed, actually loved, writing it."

Also on the book's publication, Burton Rascoe compared it to the work of Anatole France and James Stephens. He praised Cabell's delicacy and self-directed satire, and suggested that Cabell understood himself and others better than most writers do.

Louis D. Rubin praised its "hilarious situations" and specified that "the scene in which Harrowby 'deciphers' the meaning of the Sigil is absurdly comic." C. John McCole, though stating that the reader would "nod a great deal" during this and Cabell's earlier work, also singled out some humorous parts—the rejection letters Kennaston gets on his first novel and his discussion with "his rather unsympathetic wife" of a writer's difficulties—as among Cabell's best.

Seeing a more serious side, Carl Van Doren wrote that Kennaston's story allegorically represented the human race's tendency to "create better regions to dream in" Likewise Hugh Walpole regarded the story as less interesting than Cabell's theme of longing for dreams, given its clearest expression (as of 1920) in this book.

For Frank Northen Magill, what Cabell expressed with more sophistication here than elsewhere was his "genius for metafictional illusion".

== Allusions ==
The name Horvendile is that of characters in Germanic mythology and history also spelled Aurvandil, Horwendill, and the like. In other books Cabell connects the name both to Hamlet's father in the Gesta Danorum and to the character in the Prose Edda whose big toe froze off and was made into a star.

In the excerpt from Kennaston's book, Horvendile extemporizes a poem in Provençal; aside from two lines in the original, it is given in English prose. The poem is Can vei la lauzeta mover by Bernart de Ventadorn.

A minor character, a man famous for many achievements, is a portrait of Theodore Roosevelt.

The narrator mentions a number of Protestant theologians whose ideas Kennaston sees as akin to the Christianity he arrives at, with its "Artist-God" Whose greatest character was Himself as Christ. Among those theologians are exponents of the moral-influence theory of Christ's atonement such as Friedrich Schleiermacher and Horace Bushnell.

== References to other works by Cabell ==
Kennaston's novel is reminiscent of Cabell's 1913 novel The Soul of Melicent, later republished under the writer's original title Domnei, which is part of his series Biography of the Life of Manuel. Horvendile and Ettare appear in various other stories in this series, set in the fictional realm of Poictesme, and Lichfield is a setting of other Cabell books. The Cream of the Jest connects the two settings. Felix Kennaston had appeared and been quoted in some of Cabell's previous books. In particular, in Cabell's fictional genealogies, he shows Kennaston to be a descendant of Dom Manuel.

Both Theodore Roosevelt and another minor character warn Kennaston cryptically about the sigil in his novel, in which connection they mention white pigeons and a small mirror. The latter items figure in a mysterious ceremony that appears throughout Cabell's work but is never described.

== Literary legacy ==
This book inspired Flann O'Brien to write of characters who rebel against their author, as in At Swim-Two-Birds. (Though Kennaston's characters interact with him in the person of Horvendile, they do not rebel against him.)
