= Charles Cooper Nott Jr. =

American attorney and jurist

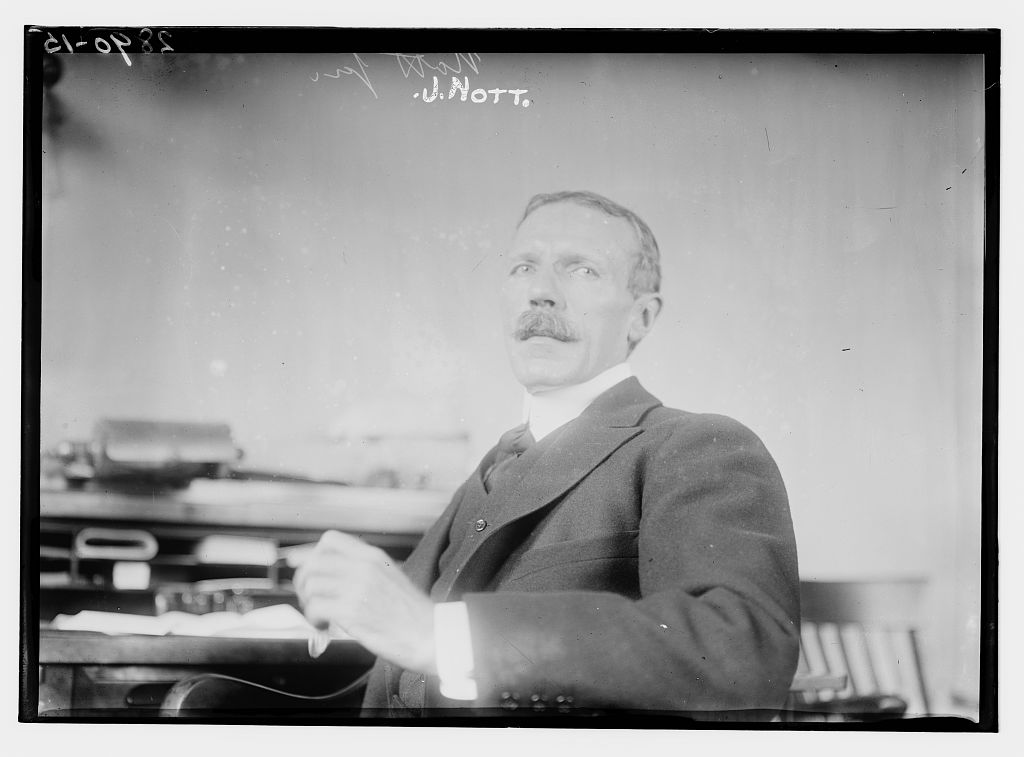
- Nott in 1913
- Born: October 10, 1869; Williamstown, Massachusetts, US
- Died: May 10, 1957 (aged 87); New York City, US
- Education: Williams College; Harvard Law School
- Spouses: Julia Jerome Hildt (m. 1896; died 1912) Mary Porter Mitchell (m. 1916)
- Children: 4
- Parent(s): Charles Cooper Nott Sr. Alice Effingham Hopkins Nott
- Relatives: Eliphalet Nott (great-grandfather)

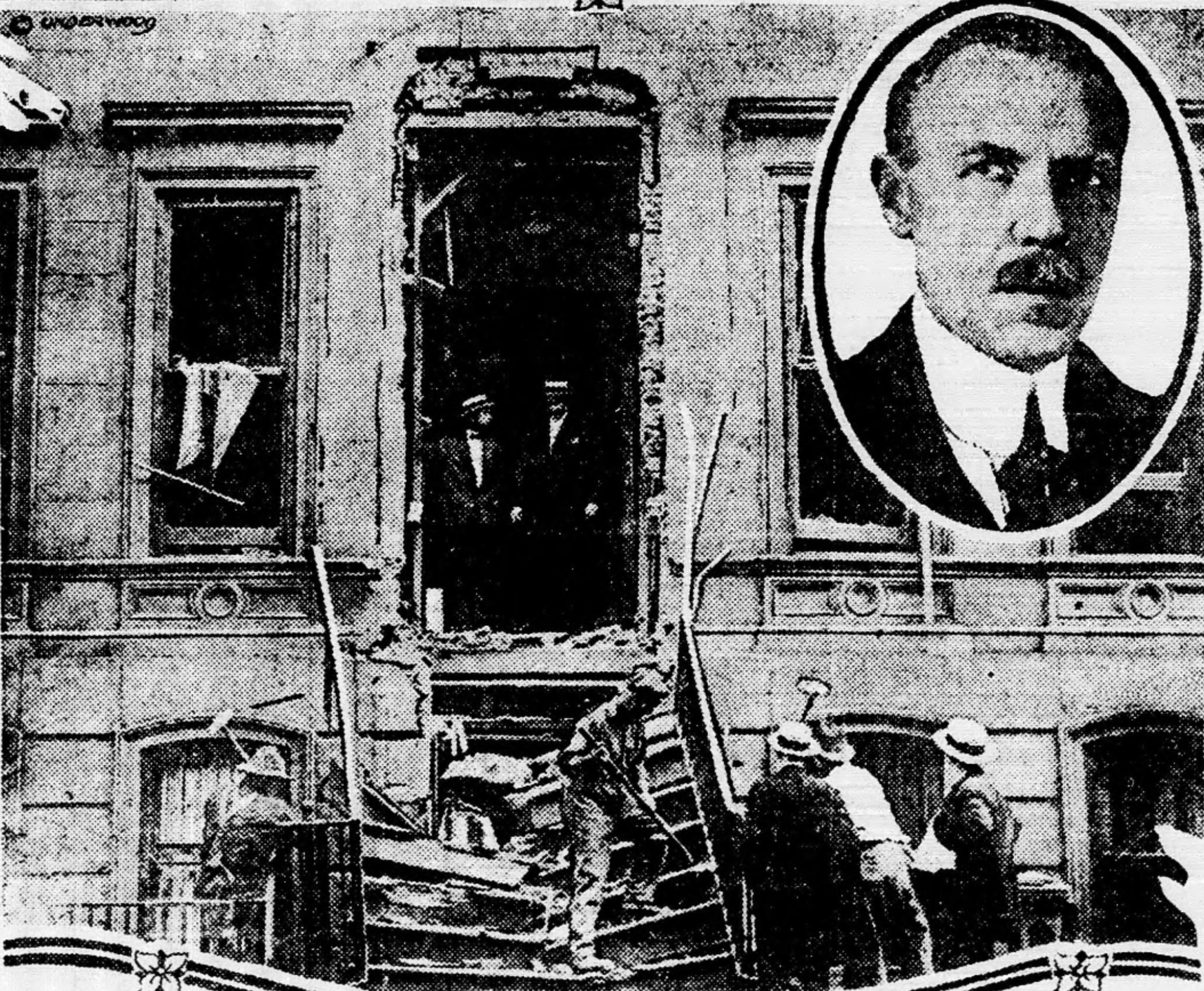
Judge Charles C Knott insert with house in NYC after an anarchist bomb 1919

Charles Cooper Nott Jr. (October 10, 1869 – May 10, 1957) was an American attorney and jurist. He served as judge of the New York General Sessions Court from 1913 to 1939. In 1919 anarchists were planting a bomb on his doorstep when it prematurely exploded killing both of the bombers. In 1922 he presided over the obscenity case of James Branch Cabell and Robert Medill McBride for the novel, Jurgen, A Comedy of Justice. In 1939 he presided over the second trial of James Joseph Hines.

== Early life ==
Nott was born in Williamstown, Massachusetts, on October 10, 1869. He was the son of Alice Effingham (née Hopkins) Nott and Charles Cooper Nott Sr., the chief justice of the United States Court of Claims.

His great-grandfather was Eliphalet Nott, the longtime President of Union College, and his great-aunt, Sarah Marie Nott, was married to Bishop Alonzo Potter.

Nott graduated from Williams College in 1890, then received his law degree from Harvard Law School.

== Career ==
After his graduation and until November 1913, Nott was an assistant district attorney for New York City for district attorney William Travers Jerome.

From November 1913 to 1939 he was a judge for the New York General Sessions Court. In 1922, he presided over the obscenity case of James Branch Cabell and Robert Medill McBride for the novel, Jurgen, A Comedy of Justice. Nott wrote in his decision that "...the most that can be said against the book is that certain passages therein may be considered suggestive in a veiled and subtle way of immorality, but such suggestions are delicately conveyed [and that because of Cabell's writing style] ... it is doubtful if the book could be read or understood at all by more than a very limited number of readers."

In 1939, Nott presided over the second trial of James Joseph Hines, the Democratic Party politician who was one of the most powerful leaders of Tammany Hall in New York City, where Hines was found guilty on corruption and conspiracy charges.

=== Assassination attempt ===
There was an attempted assassination in 1919 when anarchists planted a bomb at his doorstep. The bomb prematurely exploded, killing both of the bombers. The opinion of the police was that Federal Judge John Clark Knox, who presided over cases during the First Red Scare, may have been the intended target, and the bombers had confused their names.

== Personal life ==
On November 12, 1896, he married Julia Jerome Hildt (1871–1912), the daughter of Frances Jewitt "Fanny" (née Jerome) Hildt and John McClean Hildt. Together, Charles and Julia were the parents of four children:

- Dorothy Nott (1898–1899), who died in infancy.
- Frances Jerome Nott (b. 1900), who first married Stacy Courtis Richmond Jr. (1898–1931) in 1922. After his death, she married James Smith Hemingway Jr. (1899–1961) in 1934.
- Joel Benedict Nott (1903–1931), who died in an aircrash on Saturday, November 21, 1931, at the New Bern Regional Airport.
- Lawrence Hopkins Nott (1906–1986), who married Janet Lawton.

After his first wife's death, he remarried to Mary Porter Mitchell (1878–1960) on April 15, 1916, in Williamstown. Mary, who was born in Pawtucket, Rhode Island, was the daughter of Emily Frances and James Mitchell of Newton, Massachusetts.

Nott died on May 10, 1957, at St. Luke's Hospital in Manhattan.
