= Silver Stallion =

Silver Stallion may refer to:

- Étalon d'Argent de Yennenga, or Silver Stallion (of Yennenga), an African film award presented at FESPACO each year
- Silver Stallion (1941 film), an American Western film
- Silver Stallion (1991 film), a South Korean film
- "Silver Stallion" (song), a 1978 song by Lee Clayton, covered by The Highwaymen

== See also ==
- The Silver Stallion, a novel by James Branch Cabell
