= Intromission =

Intromission may refer to:

- Sexual intercourse (colloquial)
- Copulation (zoology)
- Intromission theory, a theory of visual perception
- Vicious intromission, a concept in Scottish law

== See also ==
- intermission (disambiguation)
- Intromittent organ
