= The High Place =

1923 fantasy novel by James Branch Cabell

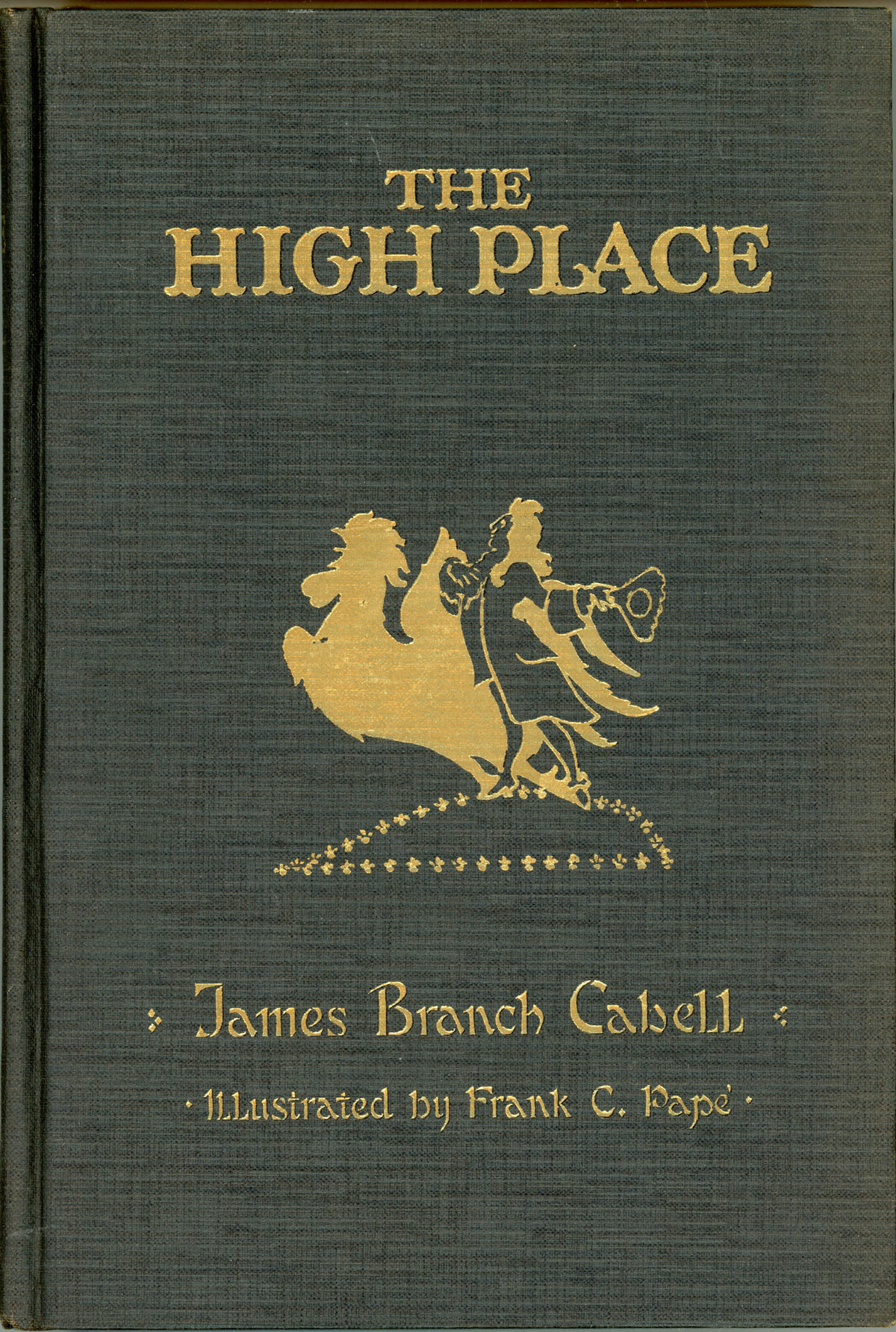
- First edition
- Author: James Branch Cabell
- Illustrator: Frank C. Pape
- Language: English
- Series: Biography of the Life of Manuel
- Genre: Fantasy novel
- Publisher: Robert M. McBride
- Publication date: 1923
- Publication place: United States
- Media type: Print (Hardback)
- Pages: ix, 312 pp
- OCLC: 2712563
- Preceded by: The Line of Love
- Followed by: Gallantry

The High Place (subtitled A Comedy of Disenchantment) is a 1923 fantasy novel by James Branch Cabell, first published in hardcover by Robert M. McBride in an edition illustrated by Frank C. Pape. It is the eighth volume in the Storisende edition of Cabell's Biography of the Life of Manuel. The High Place is a satirical sequel to the Sleeping Beauty tales, depicting a marriage where the "happily ever after" coda has gone far awry.

In 1936, dramatist Sidney Kingsley attempted to stage an adaptation of the novel, to be retitled "The Enchanted Princess", on Broadway. Frank Morgan was reported to be the likely star of the production. The production was abandoned later that year, and Kingsley let his option on the novel expire.

The High Place was revived in 1970 as a release in the Ballantine Adult Fantasy Series. It was reissued later in the decade by both Del Rey Books and Dover Books.

== Reception ==
H. L. Mencken called The High Place "an extremely amusing book, full of both gaudy nonsense and penetrating observation"; he praised it lavishly in The American Mercury, saying "The tale has charm almost without measure. It is clear-running, it is ingenious, and it is full of truly delightful detail. Mr. Cabell was never more shrewd, sardonic, iconoclastic, daring. He has made a romance that is captivating in itself, and yet remains the reductio ad absurdum of all romance. It is as if the species came to perfect flower in a bloom that poisoned itself". The New York Times reviewer Lloyd Morris praised the "conscious insincerity" of Cabell's writing, saying "There is a false paganism, a sophisticated grace" in it, citing "His cultivated preciosity, his erudite artificiality, [and] his elaborate daintiness." But Morris also faulted the novel's erotic themes, saying "Much of the book is definitely distasteful in its explicit -- and gratuitous -- suggestions of sexual aberration and sexual perversion". Edmund Wilson rated The High Place as "one of the best of Cabell's books," saying "Here the dream evanescences and the images cast from mirrors reach a point of expert juggling that half conveys disquieting meanings".

The New-York Tribune "helpfully suggested", as Cabell put it, "in an editorial, that the then world-famous Leopold-Loeb murder had been prompted by a reading of The High Place".

Discussing the 1970 reissue, M. John Harrison also found The High Place "an amusing and entertaining book," noting that "Cabell's wit is as sharp and as nasty as ever, and seems to gain in power when removed to a less Medieval milieu". James Blish wrote that "like all [Cabell's] works, it is written with unfailing elegance, and is both funny and sad at once." E. F. Bleiler described the novel as "A dream quest heavily laden with fairy tale material" and "a horrifying picture of life in a decadent culture".
