= James Joseph Hines =

American politician (1876–1957)

James Joseph Hines (December 18, 1876 – March 26, 1957) was a Democratic Party politician and one of the most powerful leaders of Tammany Hall in New York City.

== Biography ==
In his early years, Hines acted as a caretaker to residents in New York's Eleventh Assembly District. This helped him win support and influence over the area's residents. In the 1920s and 1930s, Hines maintained "absolute power" over his district and was arguably the most powerful political boss in Tammany Hall.

Jimmy Walker's election as Mayor of New York City would also firmly establish Hines' influence over the local political scene As boss of Tammany Hall's Eleventh Assembly District in uptown Manhattan, Hines had access to various sources of wealth and developed close ties with many mobsters such as Lucky Luciano, leader of the city's dominant Luciano crime family. He attended the 1932 Democratic National Convention with Frank Costello, whom he shared a room with at the Drake Hotel. Through Hines, Costello briefly met future president Franklin Delano Roosevelt, who he was introduced to as a New York businessman.

In 1932, New York Governor Franklin D. Roosevelt ran for President and wanted to weaken Tammany Hall. Walker, who was tainted by allegations of City contract corruption and was a threat to Roosevelt's campaign, was pressured by him into resigning. Seeing Tammany Hall as a political liability, Roosevelt decided to appoint a new mayor, a privilege the New York Governor had after any mayor of New York City resigned, and focused on backing a candidate who would destroy Tammany Hall's power for good.

Liberal Republican Fiorello LaGuardia, a former Representative and a fierce opponent of Tammany Hall whom Hines had successfully forced from power in the 1932 Congressional election, was elected mayor in 1933, and Tammany Hall's longtime influence over local politicians faded. Hines would not fall. After becoming President, Roosevelt appointed Hines to oversee the U.S. civil service's patronage system for employees in the Manhattan District. Hines' empire grew soon afterward.

In 1938, Hines was accused of being involved in the policy racket with Dutch Schultz (who was murdered in 1935) and Dixie Davis and of violating the "lottery laws". Manhattan District Attorney Thomas E. Dewey would successfully get Hines convicted on 13 counts of racketeering. Hines provided protection for the policy racket in Harlem and other sections of New York. Hines was charged with influencing Magistrates Capshaw and Erwin to throw out policy cases in which the other conspirators had an interest and to influence former District Attorney William C. Dodge to 'go easy' on policy prosecutions. Hines was alleged to have received a cut in the proceeds of the policy racket.

After the first trial ended in a mistrial, he was charged again and Charles Cooper Nott Jr. presided over the second trial.

He died on March 26, 1957, at the Long Beach Memorial Hospital. He was successfully prosecuted and sentenced to spend time incarcerated.
