= Hamlet Had an Uncle =

Novel by James Branch Cabell

First edition (publ. Farrar & Rinehart)

Hamlet Had an Uncle: A Comedy of Honor is a novel by James Branch Cabell, published in 1940. It is the second book of his trilogy Heirs and Assigns. Cabell had incubated a 'true version' of the Hamlet story for decades, and based his tale on Saxo Grammaticus, whose epic saga recounts the story of the historical Hamlet, Prince of Jutland, his murder of his father Horvendill, and his rivalry with Wiglek, the Prince of Denmark.

== Reception ==
Kirkus Reviews declared it to be "slightly salacious" and "highly specialized nature, for those who like this eclectic type of thing".
