= Intermission (disambiguation) =

An intermission is a break in a play, concert or film, also in sports games. Intermission can also refer to:

== Albums ==
- Intermission (Dio album), 1986
- Intermission (Robert Forster & Grant McLennan album), 2007
- Intermission (Stratovarius album), 2001
- Soul Assassins: Intermission, a 2009 album by Soul Assassins
- Intermission: the Greatest Hits, a 2000 compilation album by DC Talk
- Intermission: The Singles Collection, a 2003 compilation album by Amanda Marshall
- Intermission: Extraneous Music from the Residents' Mole Show, a 1982 EP by The Residents
- Intermission EP, a 2008 EP by Dragon Fli Empire
- Intermission (Maren Morris EP), 2024
- Intermission (Shigeto EP), 2015
- Intermission I & II, a 2015 double EP by Trey Songz

== Songs ==
- "Intermission", by Blur from Modern Life Is Rubbish, 1993
- "Intermission", by The Cranberries from To the Faithful Departed, 1996
- "Intermission", by Emma Pollock from In Search of Harperfield, 2016
- "Intermission", by The Offspring from Ixnay on the Hombre, 1997
- "Intermission", by Panic! At The Disco from A Fever You Can't Sweat Out., 2005
- "Intermission", by PinkPantheress from Fancy That, 2025
- "Intermission", by R. Kelly from 12 Play, 1993
- "Intermission", by Scissor Sisters from Ta-Dah, 2006
- "Intermission", by Tool from Ænima, 1996

== Other uses ==
- Intermission (band), a 1993-1996 German Eurodance band
- Intermission (film), a 2003 film set in Dublin, Ireland
- Intermission (Hopper), a 1963 painting by Edward Hopper

== See also ==
- Camp Intermission, New York, also known as William Morris House, on the National Register of Historic Places
- Intromission (disambiguation)
- Intermedio, Italian Renaissance music which was performed between acts of a play
- Intermedio (film) ("intermission" in Spanish), a 2005 movie
- Entr'acte
