= Interval (2025 film) =

2025 Kannada-language film

- Directed by: Bharatvarsh
- Written by: Suki
- Produced by: Bharatvarsh Pictures
- Starring: Shashi Raj; Suki; Prajwal Kumar Gowda; Charithra Rao; Sahana Aaradhya
- Cinematography: Raj Kanth S. K
- Edited by: Shashidhar Puttegowda
- Music by: Vikas Vasishta
- Distributed by: Vijay Cinemas
- Release date: 7 March 2025
- Running time: 143 minutes
- Country: India
- Language: Kannada

Interval is a 2025 Indian Kannada-language comedy-drama film directed by Bharatvarsh and written by Suki. Produced by Suki in collaboration with Bharatvarsh Pictures, the film stars Shashi Raj in the titular role, alongside Suki, Prajwal Kumar Gowda, Charithra Rao, and Sahana Aaradhya.

== Plot ==
The story follows three inseparable childhood friends—Ganesh S, Ganesh T, and Ganesh U—living in a small village. Despite their shared knack for mischief and underachievement, they surprisingly pass their 10th-grade exams and enter a mechanical engineering college. However, their academic discipline remains poor, and their carefree lifestyle causes chaos in the village.

Ganesh S quietly harbors feelings for Sihi, his cousin, but his irresponsibility puts a strain on their bond. A series of events, including a mishap during a festival and neglecting a promised vote, leads to the trio being disowned by their families. They flee to Bengaluru seeking a new beginning.

Struggling to adapt to city life and facing multiple rejections, the trio's lives take a turn when they meet Sahana, an entrepreneur. Through her, Ganesh S finds purpose and proposes a farm-to-home delivery startup. However, personal insecurities and social differences pull him back. As tensions rise, the trio returns to their village to confront their past and seek redemption.

== Cast ==
- Shashi Raj as Ganesh S
- Prajwal Kumar Gowda as Ganesh T
- Suki as Ganesh U
- Charithra Rao as Sihi (Voice dubbed by Vina)
- Sahana Aaradhya as Nisha (Voice dubbed by Kuritha)
- Ranganath Shivamogga as Masaru
- Danam Shivamogga as Patel

== Sound Tracks & Music ==
The music and background score were composed by Vikas Vasishta, featuring five tracks under the Anand Audio label. The album was praised for its relatability to youth and emotional tone. It includes performances by All Ok, Chandan Shetty, Vijay Prakash, Sunidhi Ganesh, Vani Harikrishna, and Siddhartha Belmannu.

Tack Listing
No.	Title	Lyrics	Singer (S)	Length
1.	"Ganesh Song"	Vijaya Shankar	Chandan Shetty	03:41
2.	"Yeno Shuruvaagide"	Pramod Maravanthe	Siddhartha Belmannu, Sunidhi Ganesh	04:13
3.	"Unemployment"	Suki	All Ok	02:59
4.	"Text Book"	Suki	Vani Harikrishna	03:35
5.	"INTERVAL Title"	Pramod Maravanthe	Vijay Prakash	04:02

== Marketing and Release ==
The first look poster was unveiled in Bengaluru in 2024, followed by the release of the first single during Ganesha Chaturthi. The trailer, launched by actor Sri Murali, gained attention for its relatable story and rural appeal.

Interval was distributed by Vijay Cinemas and released theatrically on 7 March 2025 with a U/A certificate. It opened on 120 screens across Karnataka and enjoyed a successful 25-day run in several centers.

== Reception ==
=== Critical response ===
The Times of India described Interval as "a rural comedy bogged down by a weak second half", but acknowledged its effort in connecting with a regional audience through grounded characters and settings.

Times Now called it "a comedy that rings a bell for youth", especially for those from non-urban backgrounds, and highlighted the film's message on finding purpose in the face of rejection and failure.

Cinema Express praised the film's tone, calling it “a sweet break in the chaos of youthful life” and noted its open-ended climax as “symbolically aligned with the title”, suggesting that life's transitions often feel like an ‘interval’.

Bangalore Mirror wrote that Interval is "a unique Kannada film that speaks to today's youth", emphasizing its relevance for students and job seekers struggling with direction and purpose.

The New Indian Express appreciated the film's balance of humor and drama, calling it "relatable and emotionally grounded" while recognizing its evolving tone in the second half.

Regional media outlets echoed these sentiments. TV9 Kannada described the film as “bursting with punchy dialogues and youthful energy,” capturing the spirit of village life and mischievous friendship.

Udayavani and Asianet Suvarna News appreciated its dual narrative—starting as a comedy and transitioning into a serious tale of responsibility—with Udayavani calling it “an experience of real life for three dream-chasing youths.”

Vijayavani noted the film's thematic shift, writing “even with nothing in the village, there's peace; while in the city, everything exists but feels empty.” Eesanje stated that Interval is “a comedy-filled film that keeps audiences laughing throughout.”
