= Vicious intromission =

Vicious intromission is a term of Scots law denoting the unauthorised assumption of ownership, or other interference with the rights of an estate. In 1771 James Boswell appeared before the Court of Session in Wilson vs Smith and Armour, arguing for a return to the principle that the punishment for vicious intromission should be restored to its traditional severity, of rendering the intromittor liable to pay all the debts of the estate. His attempt was unsuccessful, but led to an exchange with his friend Doctor Johnson in July 1772, recorded in his Life of Samuel Johnson, in which the latter wrote a paper on the legal principles involved, stating misera est servitus ubi jus est aut incognitum aut vagum ("miserable is that state of slavery in which the law is unknown or uncertain").
