= Poictesme =

Fictional kingdom by James Branch Cabell

- 'Biography of the Life of Manuel' location
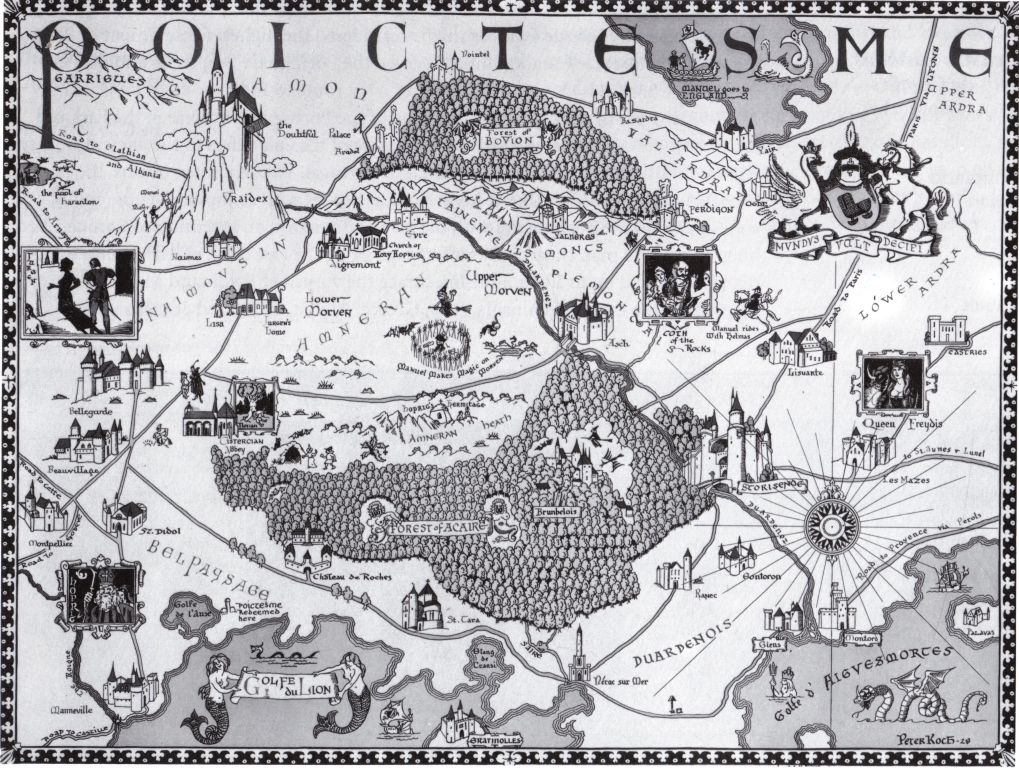
- Map of Poictesme drawn by Peter Koch

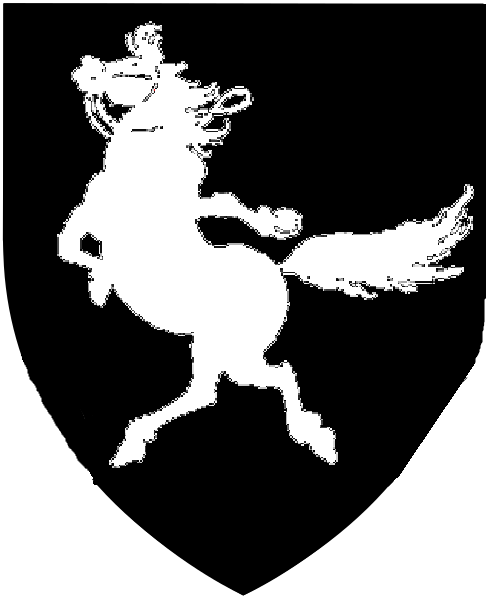
- Coat of arms
- First appearance: The Eagle's Shadow
- Last appearance: Something About Eve
- Created by: James Branch Cabell
- Genre: Satirical fantasy

In-universe information
- Type: Feudal fiefdom
- Ruled by: Count Dom Manuel
- Ethnic group: Poictoumois
- Locations: Storisende (capital)
- Characters: Count Dom Manuel, Jurgen
- Motto: Mundus vult decipi ("The world wants to be deceived")

Poictesme (/pwɑːˈtɛm/) is a fictional country or province which forms the setting of the fantasy works of James Branch Cabell, known collectively as Biography of the Life of Manuel. Poictesme is ruled by the Count Dom Manuel.

It was the author's intention to situate Poictesme roughly in Southern France. The name suggests the two real French cities of Poitiers (medieval Poictiers) and Angoulême (medieval Angoulesme). Poictesme is a fief of King Ferdinand of Castile and León, who installs Manuel as count in the year 1234. Cabell's fictional history of the country extends as far as the 17th century.

The first map of Poictesme was drawn by Cabell himself, but other maps were created by artists such as Frank C. Papé, Peter Koch, and Judith Ann Lawrence.

At the height of Cabell's popularity in the 1920s, Cabell's publishers sold framed wall-maps of Poictesme.

The undergraduate literary journal of Virginia Commonwealth University is named pwatem after the fictional province.

== Other references ==
In H. Beam Piper's popular science fiction novel, Junkyard Planet (Putnams 1963 & Wildside Press, 2007 ISBN 978-1-4344-0085-7, also published as The Cosmic Computer in paperback edition), Poictesme is the name of the planet on which the main body of the story occurs. A specific reference is made to Cabell.

Poictesme is also a moon of the planet Sauron in War World: The Battle of Sauron by John Carr and Don Hawthorne (Pequod Press, 2007, ISBN 0-937912-04-2).

Poictesme and Lotharingia are two of the three kingdoms in a short story by Isaac Asimov, "Prince Delightful and the Flameless Dragon". The story first appeared in Once Upon a Time: A Treasury of Modern Fairy Tales (Del Rey / Ballantine Books, 1991); it also appears in Asimov's anthology Magic: The Final Fantasy Collection (HarperCollins Publishers, 1996, ISBN 0-06-105205-1).

The graphic novel/webcomic Girl Genius makes a passing reference to a "Poictesme Province" within its own fantasy version of Europe, in the strip of March 31, 2014.

In Judith Tarr's novel Kingdom of the Grail, Poictesme is a region in the mystical land of Montsalvat, along with Lyonesse, Caer Sidi, and Carbonek.
