= Mundus vult decipi, ergo decipiatur =

Latin phrase

Mundus vult decipi, ergo decipiatur, a Latin phrase, means "The world wants to be deceived, so let it be deceived."

== Attributions ==
According to the Great Norwegian Encyclopedia, the phrase is first documented in Sebastian Brant's Das Narrenschiff (1494), in the form "Die weltt die will betrogen syn". It notes that it has since continuously been ascribed to older writers.

Various claims have been made as to the phrase's origin:

- "Mundus vult decipi." Sebastian Franck, Paradoxa Ducenta Octoginta, CCXXXVIII (1542) "The world loves to be deceived."
- "Augustine of Hippo, lib. 4. de civitat. Dei, cap. 27. censures ' Scævola saying and acknowledging expedire civitates religione falli, that it was a fit thing [that] cities should be deceived by religion, (Note: "Quod eorum qui sint dii non habeant ciuitates uera simulacra, quod uerus deus nec sexum habeat nec aetatem nec definita corporis membra." Haec pontifex nosse populos non uult; nam falsa esse non putat. Expedire igitur existimat falli in religione ciuitates. — Augustin. de civ. Dei, B. 4) according to the diverb, Si mundus vult decipi, decipiatur, if the world will be gulled, let it be gulled, 'tis good howsoever to keep it in subjection." (Robert Burton, The Anatomy of Melancholy, first published 1621)
- "The pontifex maximus Scævola thought it expedient that the people should be deceived in religion; and the learned Varro said plainly, that there are many truths which it is useless for the vulgar to know; and many falsities which it is fit the people should not suppose are falsities. (Note: Vid Augustin. de civ. Dei, B. 4 [...]. (Note: Haec pontifex nosse populos non uult; nam falsa esse non putat. Expedire igitur existimat falli in religione ciuitates. Quod dicere etiam in libris rerum diuinarum Varro ipse non dubitat. — Augustin. de civ. Dei, B. 4)) Hence comes the adage "Mundus vult decipi, decipiatur ergo."
- Samuel Arthur Bent in his 1882 Familiar Short Sayings of Great Men notes that the maxim "Mundus vult decipi, ergo decipiatur" is attributed by the poet Julius Wilhelm Zincgref in his German Apothegms" to the papal legate Oliviero Carafa. Zincgref also noted that the German equivalent "Die Welt will betrogen sein" was already a common expression, which finds frequent quotation in Luther, and was in Goethe's mind when he said, "Man is never deceived: he deceives himself"

== Misattribution ==
Some claim that the 1st century satirist Petronius originated this expression, but it appears nowhere in the surviving copies of his work.
