= James Branch Cabell =

American novelist (1879–1958)

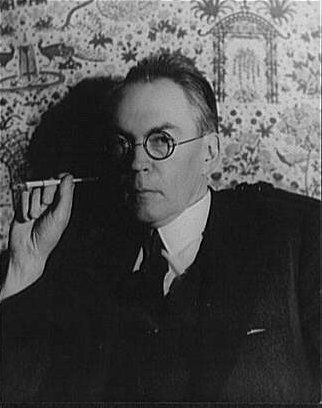
- James Branch Cabell photographed by Carl Van Vechten, 1935
- Born: April 14, 1879; Richmond, Virginia, U.S.
- Died: May 5, 1958 (aged 79); Richmond, Virginia, U.S.
- Resting place: Hollywood Cemetery, Richmond, Virginia, U.S.
- Education: College of William and Mary
- Occupation: Author
- Writing career
- Genre: Fantasy fiction

James Branch Cabell (/ˈkæbəl/; April 14, 1879 – May 5, 1958) was an American author of fantasy fiction and belles-lettres. Cabell was well-regarded by his contemporaries, including H. L. Mencken, Edmund Wilson, and Sinclair Lewis. His works were considered escapist and fit well in the culture of the 1920s, when they were most popular. For Cabell, veracity was "the one unpardonable sin, not merely against art, but against human welfare".

Although escapist, Cabell's works are ironic and satirical. Mencken disputed Cabell's claim to romanticism and characterized him as "really the most acidulous of all the anti-romantics. His gaudy heroes ... chase dragons precisely as stockbrokers play golf." According to Louis D. Rubin, Cabell saw art as an escape from life, but found that, once the artist creates his ideal world, it is made up of the same elements that make the real one.

Interest in Cabell declined in the 1930s, a decline that has been attributed in part to his failure to move out of his fantasy niche despite the onset of World War II. Alfred Kazin said that "Cabell and Hitler did not inhabit the same universe". The library at Virginia Commonwealth University is named after Cabell.

== Life ==
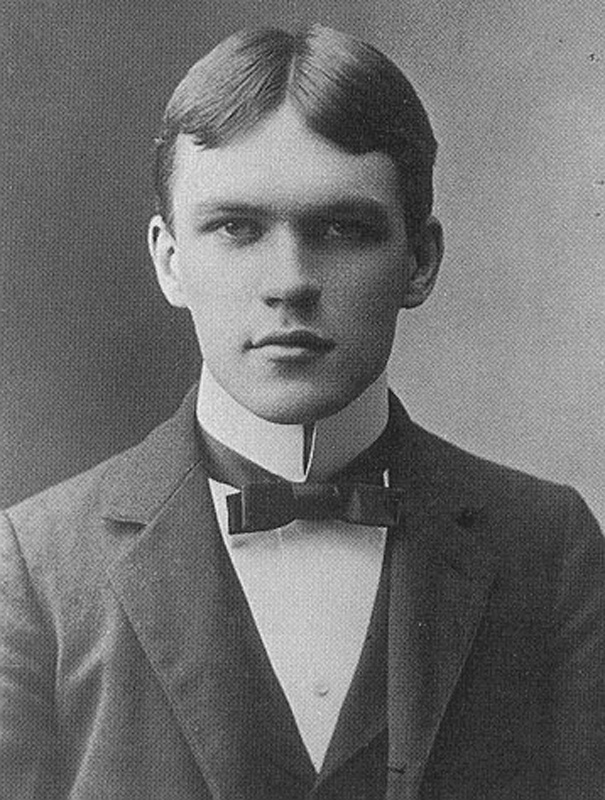
Cabell in 1893 at age 14

Cabell was born into an affluent and well-connected Virginian family, and lived most of his life in Richmond. The first Cabell settled in Virginia in 1664; Cabell's paternal great-grandfather, William H. Cabell, was Governor of the Commonwealth from 1805 to 1808. Cabell County in West Virginia is named after the Governor. James Branch Cabell's grandfather, Robert Gamble Cabell, was a physician; his father, Robert Gamble Cabell II (1847–1922), had an MD, but practiced as a druggist; his mother, Anne Harris (1859–1915), was the daughter of Lieutenant Colonel James R. Branch, of the Army of the Confederate States of America. James was the oldest of three boys—his brothers were Robert Gamble Cabell III (1881–1968) and John Lottier Cabell (1883–1946). His parents separated and were later divorced in 1907. His aunt was the suffragist and educationist Mary-Cooke Branch Munford.

Although Cabell's surname is often mispronounced "Ka-BELL", he himself pronounced it "CAB-ble". To remind an editor of the correct pronunciation, Cabell composed this rhyme: "Tell the rabble my name is Cabell."

Cabell matriculated at the College of William and Mary in 1894 at the age of fifteen and graduated in June 1898. While an undergraduate, Cabell taught French and Greek at the college. According to his close friend and fellow author Ellen Glasgow, Cabell developed a friendship with a professor at the college which was considered by some to be "too intimate," and as a result Cabell was dismissed, although he was subsequently readmitted and finished his degree. Following his graduation, he worked from 1898 to 1900 as a newspaper reporter in New York City, but returned to Richmond in 1901, where he worked for several months on the staff of the Richmond News.

1901 was an eventful year for Cabell: his first stories were accepted for publication, and he was suspected of the murder of John Scott, a wealthy Richmonder. It was rumored that Scott was involved romantically with Cabell's mother. Cabell's supposed involvement in the Scott murder and his college "scandal" were both mentioned in Ellen Glasgow's posthumously published (1954) autobiography The Woman Within. In 1902, seven of Cabell's first stories appeared in national magazines and over the next decade he wrote many short stories and articles, contributing to nationally published magazines including Harper's Monthly Magazine and The Saturday Evening Post, as well as carrying out extensive research on his family's genealogy.

Between 1911 and 1913, Cabell was employed by his uncle in the office of the Branch coal mines in West Virginia. On November 8, 1913, he married Priscilla Bradley Shepherd, a widow with five children from her previous marriage. In 1915, their son Ballard Hartwell Cabell was born. Priscilla died in March 1949; Cabell was remarried in June 1950 to Margaret Waller Freeman.

During his life, Cabell published fifty-two books, including novels, genealogies, collections of short stories, poetry, and miscellanea. He was elected to the American Academy of Arts and Letters in 1937.

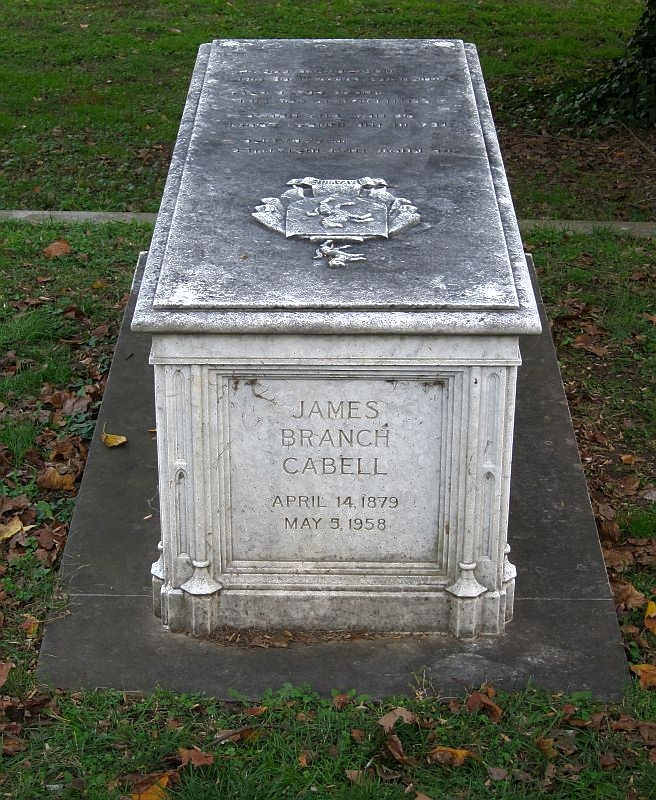
Grave of Cabell in Hollywood Cemetery

In 1958, Cabell died of a cerebral hemorrhage in Richmond and was buried in the graveyard of the Emmanuel Church at Brook Hill. The following year, the remains of Cabell and his first wife were reinterred in Hollywood Cemetery.

Significant Cabell collections are housed at various repositories, including Virginia Commonwealth University and the University of Virginia.

== Honors ==
In 1970, Virginia Commonwealth University, also located in Richmond, named its main campus library "James Branch Cabell Library" in his honor. In the 1970s, Cabell's personal library and personal papers were moved from his home on Monument Avenue to the James Branch Cabell Library. Consisting of some 3,000 volumes, the collection includes manuscripts; notebooks and scrapbooks; periodicals in which Cabell's essays, reviews and fiction were published; his correspondence with noted writers including H. L. Mencken, Ellen Glasgow, Sinclair Lewis, and Theodore Dreiser; correspondence with family, friends, editors and publishers, newspaper clippings, photographs, periodicals, criticisms, printed material; publishers' agreements; and statements of sales. The collection resides in the Special Collections and Archives department of the library. The VCU undergraduate literary journal at the university is named Poictesme after the fictional province in his cycle Biography of the Life of Manuel.

Starting in 2016, VCU began a planned $50 million renovation to expand and modernize James Branch Cabell Library. In 2016, James Branch Cabell Library won the New Landmark Library Award. The Library Journal's website provides a virtual walking tour of the new James Branch Cabell Library.

== Works ==
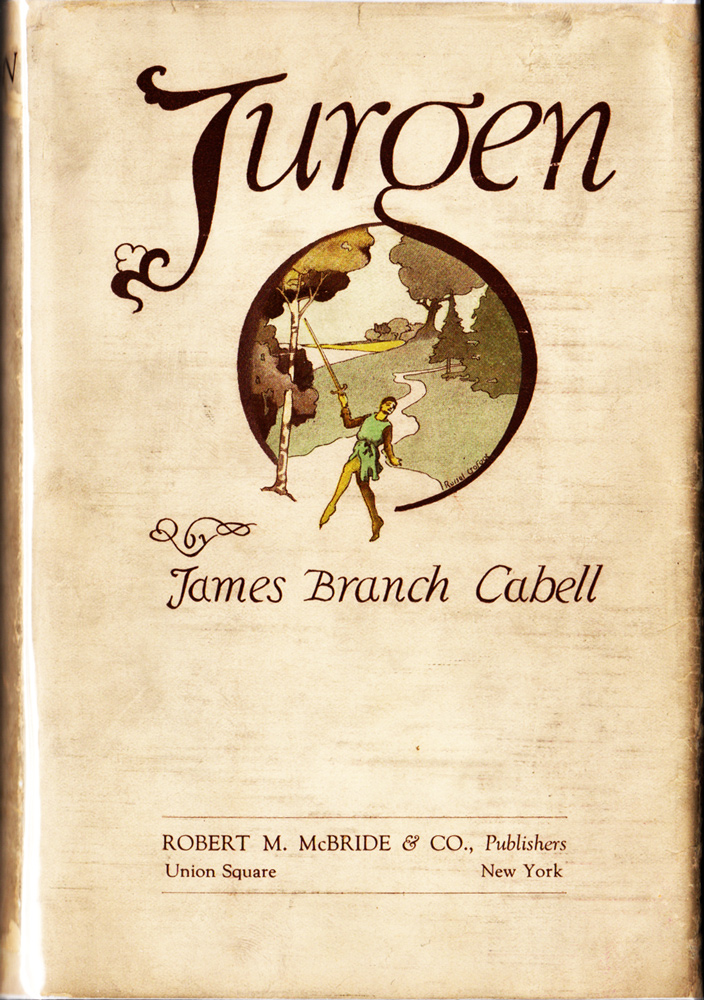
Dust jacket of Jurgen, A Comedy of Justice

=== Jurgen ===
Cabell's best-known book, Jurgen, A Comedy of Justice (1919), was the subject of a celebrated obscenity case shortly after its publication. The eponymous hero, who considers himself a "monstrous clever fellow", embarks on a journey through ever more fantastic realms, even to hell and heaven. Everywhere he goes, he winds up seducing the local women, even the Devil's wife.

The novel was denounced by the New York Society for the Suppression of Vice; they attempted to bring a prosecution for obscenity. The case went on for two years before Cabell and his publisher, Robert M. McBride, won: the "indecencies" were double entendres that also had a perfectly decent interpretation, though it appeared that what had actually offended the prosecution most was a joke about papal infallibility. The presiding judge, Charles Cooper Nott Jr., wrote in his decision that "... the most that can be said against the book is that certain passages therein may be considered suggestive in a veiled and subtle way of immorality, but such suggestions are delicately conveyed" and that because of Cabell's writing style "it is doubtful if the book could be read or understood at all by more than a very limited number of readers."

Cabell took an author's revenge. In 1920, he published The Judging of Jurgen, a short description in which the hero is placed on trial by the Philistines, with a large tumblebug as the chief prosecutor, which was appended to the Foreword in later editions of Jurgen. He also wrote a short book, Taboo, in which he thanked John S. Sumner and the Society for the Suppression of Vice for generating the publicity that gave his career a boost. Due to the notoriety of the suppression of Jurgen, Cabell became a figure of international fame. In the early 1920s, he became associated by some critics with a group of writers referred to as "The James Branch Cabell School", which included such figures as Mencken, Carl Van Vechten, and Elinor Wylie.

=== Biography of the Life of Manuel ===
A great deal of Cabell's work consists of the Biography of the Life of Manuel, the story of a character named Dom Manuel and his descendants through many generations. The biography includes a total of 25 works that were written over a 23-year period. Cabell stated that he considered the Biography to be a single work, and supervised its publication in a single uniform edition of 18 volumes, known as the Storisende Edition, published from 1927 to 1930. A number of the volumes of the Biography were also published in editions illustrated by Frank C. Papé between 1921 and 1926.

The themes and characters from Jurgen make appearances in many works included in the Biography. Figures of Earth tells the story of Manuel the swineherd, a morally ambiguous protagonist who rises to conquer a realm by playing on others' expectations—his motto being Mundus Vult Decipi, meaning "the world wishes to be deceived." The Silver Stallion is a loose sequel to Figures of Earth that deals with the creation of the legend of Manuel the Redeemer, in which Manuel is pictured as an infallible hero, an example to which all others should aspire; the story is told by Manuel's former knights, who remember how things really were and take different approaches to reconciling the mythology with the actuality of Manuel.

Many of these books take place in the fictional country eventually ruled by Manuel, known as "Poictesme" (pronounced "pwa-tem"). It was the author's intention to situate Poictesme roughly in the south of France. The name suggests the two real French cities of Poitiers (medieval Poictiers) and Angoulême (medieval Angoulesme). Several other books take place in the fictional town of Lichfield, Virginia.

After concluding the Biography in 1932, Cabell shortened his professional name to Branch Cabell. The truncated name was used for all his new, "post-Biography" publications until the printing of There Were Two Pirates (1946).

=== Others ===
Though Cabell is best known as a fantasist, the plots and characters of his first few novels were set in everyday upper-class Virginia society: The Eagle's Shadow (1904), The Cords of Vanity (1909), and The Rivet in Grandfather's Neck (1915) (later all adapted for inclusion into the Biography). But Cabell's signature droll style is clearly in evidence, and in later printings each book would bear a characteristically Cabellian subtitle: A Comedy of Purse-Strings, A Comedy of Shirking, and A Comedy of Limitations, respectively.

His later novel, The First Gentleman of America: A Comedy of Conquest (1942), retells the strange career of an American Indian from the shores of the Potomac who sailed away with Spanish explorers, later to return, be made chief of his tribe, and kill all the Spaniards in the new Virginia settlement. Cabell delivered a more concise, historical treatment of the novel's events in The First Virginian, part one of his 1947 work of non-fiction, Let Me Lie, a book on the history of Virginia.

Other works include:

- The Nightmare Has Triplets trilogy, comprising Smirt (1934), Smith (1935), and Smire (1937)
- The Heirs and Assigns trilogy, comprising Hamlet Had an Uncle (1940), The King Was in His Counting House (1938), and The First Gentleman of America (1942)
- The It Happened in Florida trilogy, comprising The St. Johns (written in collaboration with A. J. Hanna), There Were Two Pirates (1946), and The Devil's Own Dear Son (1949)

Cabell also wrote a number of autobiographical and genealogical works.

=== List of works ===
- The Eagle's Shadow (1904)
- The Line of Love (1905) (also titled: Dizain Des Mariages)
- Gallantry (1907/22)
- Branchiana (1907)
- The Cords of Vanity: A Comedy of Shirking (1909/21)
- Chivalry: Dizain Des Reines (1909/21)
- Branch of Abingdon (1911)
- The Soul of Melicent (1913)
- The Rivet in Grandfather's Neck: A Comedy of Limitations, (1915)
- The Majors and Their Marriages (1915) (available at hathitrust.org)
- The Certain Hour (1916)
- From the Hidden Way (1916/1924)
- The Cream of the Jest (1917)
- Jurgen: A Comedy of Justice (1919)
- Beyond Life (1919)
- Domnei: A Comedy of Woman-Worship (1920)
- The Judging of Jurgen (1920)
- Jurgen and the Censor (1920)
- Taboo: A Legend Retold from The Dighic of Saevius Nicanor (1921)
- Figures of Earth: A Comedy of Appearances (1921)
- The Jewel Merchants (1921)
- Joseph Hergesheimer (1921)
- The Lineage of Lichfield: An Essay in Eugenics (1922)
- The High Place (1923)
- Straws and Prayer-Books (1924)
- The Silver Stallion (1926)
- The Music from Behind the Moon (1926)
- Something About Eve (1927)
- The Works (1927–30)
- The White Robe (1928)
- Ballades from the Hidden Way (1928)
- The Way of Ecben (1929)
- Sonnets from Antan (1929)
- Some of Us: An Essay in Epitaphs (1930)
- Townsend of Lichfield (1930)
- Between Dawn and Sunrise (1930) [edited by John Macy]
- These Restless Heads: A Trilogy of Romantics (1932)
- Special Delivery: A Packet of Replies (1933)
- Ladies and Gentlemen: A Parcel of Reconsiderations (1934)
- Smirt: An Urbane Nightmare (1934)
- Smith: A Sylvan Interlude (1935)
- Preface to the Past (1936)
- Smire: An Acceptance in the Third Person (1937)
- The Nightmare Has Triplets (1937)
- Of Ellen Glasgow (1938)
- The King Was in His Counting House (1938)
- Hamlet Had an Uncle (1940)
- The First Gentleman of America (1942) (UK title: The First American Gentleman)
- The St Johns: A Parade of Diversities (1943) [with A.J. Hanna]
- There Were Two Pirates (1946)
- Let Me Lie (1947)
- The Witch Woman (1948)
- The Devil's Own Dear Son (1949)
- Quiet Please (1952)
- As I Remember It: Some Epilogues in Recollection (1955)
- Between Friends (1962)

== Influence ==
Cabell's work was highly regarded by a number of his peers, including Mark Twain, Sinclair Lewis, H. L. Mencken, Joseph Hergesheimer, and Jack Woodford. Although now largely forgotten by the general public, his work was influential on later authors of fantasy fiction. James Blish was a fan of Cabell's works, and for a time edited Kalki, the journal of the Cabell Society. Robert A. Heinlein was greatly inspired by Cabell's boldness, and originally described his own book Stranger in a Strange Land as "a Cabellesque satire". A later work, Job: A Comedy of Justice, derived its title from Jurgen and contains appearances by Jurgen and the Slavic god Koschei. Charles G. Finney's fantasy The Circus of Dr. Lao was influenced by Cabell's work. The Averoigne stories of Clark Ashton Smith are, in background, close to those of Cabell's Poictesme. Jack Vance's Dying Earth books show considerable stylistic resemblances to Cabell; Cugel the Clever in those books bears a strong resemblance, not least in his opinion of himself, to Jurgen. Cabell was also a major influence on Neil Gaiman, acknowledged as such in Gaiman's novels Stardust and American Gods.

Cabell maintained a close and lifelong friendship with well-known Richmond writer Ellen Glasgow, whose house on West Main Street was only a few blocks from Cabell's family home on East Franklin Street. They corresponded extensively between 1923 and Glasgow's death in 1945 and over 200 of their letters survive. Cabell dedicated his 1927 novel Something About Eve to her, and she in turn dedicated her book They Stooped to Folly: A Comedy of Morals (1929) to Cabell. In 1938 Cabell and Glasgow collaborated on a fine press, author's presentation volume titled Of Ellen Glasgow. An Inscribed Portrait. In her autobiography, Glasgow also gave considerable thanks to Cabell for his help in the editing of her Pulitzer Prize-winning book In This Our Life (1941). However, late in their lives, friction developed between the two writers as a result of Cabell's critical 1943 review of Glasgow's novel A Certain Measure.

Cabell also admired the work of the Atlanta-based writer Frances Newman, though their correspondence was cut short by her death in 1928. In 1929, Cabell supplied the preface to Newman's collected letters.

From 1969 through 1972, the Ballantine Adult Fantasy series returned six of Cabell's novels to print, and elevated his profile in the fantasy genre. Today, many more of his works are available from Wildside Press.

Cabell's three-character one-act play The Jewel Merchants was used for the libretto of an opera by Louis Cheslock which premiered in 1940.

Michael Swanwick published a critical monograph on Cabell's work, which argues for the continued value of a few of Cabell's works—notably Jurgen, The Cream of the Jest, and The Silver Stallion—while acknowledging that some of his writing has dated badly. Swanwick places much of the blame for Cabell's obscurity on Cabell himself, for authorizing the 18-volume Storisende uniform edition of the Biography of the Life of Manuel, including much that was of poor quality and ephemeral. This alienated admirers and scared off potential new readers. "There are, alas, an infinite number of ways for a writer to destroy himself," Swanwick wrote. "James Branch Cabell chose one of the more interesting. Standing at the helm of the single most successful literary career of any fantasist of the twentieth century, he drove the great ship of his career straight and unerringly onto the rocks."

Other book-length studies on Cabell were written during the period of his fame by Hugh Walpole, W. A. McNeill, and Carl van Doren. In 1956, Edmund Wilson tried to rehabilitate his reputation with a long essay in The New Yorker.
