= Jurgen: A Comedy of Justice =

Fantasy novel by James Branch Cabell

Jurgen
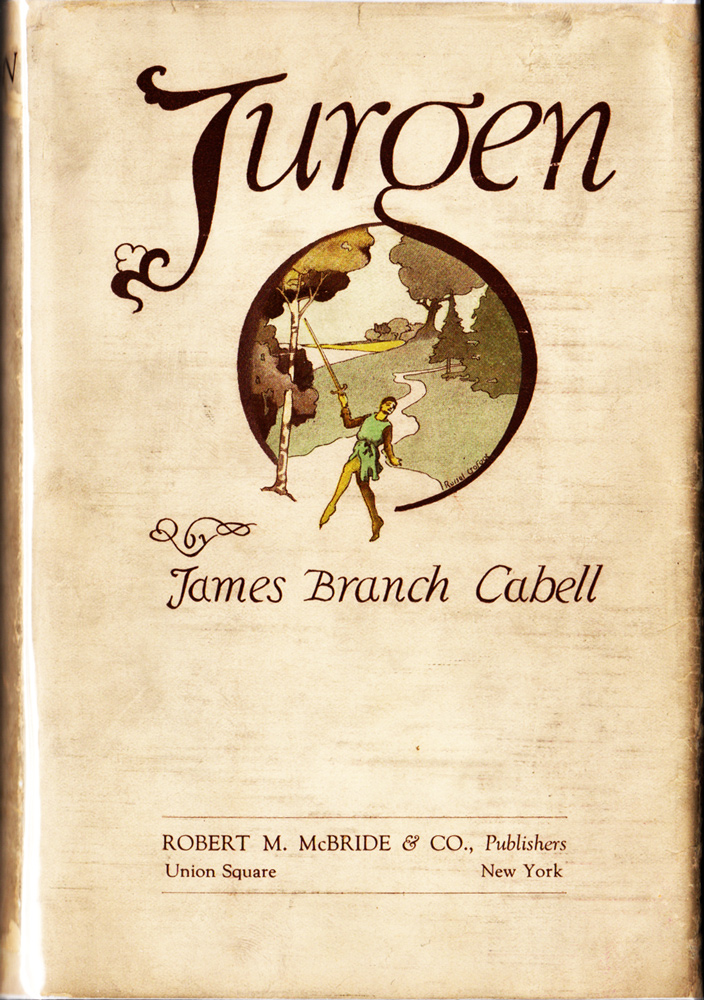
- Dust-jacket of the first edition.
- Author: James Branch Cabell
- Language: English
- Series: Biography of the Life of Manuel
- Genre: Fantasy
- Publisher: Robert M. McBride
- Publication date: 1919
- Publication place: United States
- Media type: Print (hardback)
- Pages: 368
- ISBN: 978-1515084778
- Preceded by: Chivalry
- Followed by: The Line of Love

Dust-jacket illustration by Frank C. Papé for a 1932 edition.

Jurgen: A Comedy of Justice is a fantasy novel by American writer James Branch Cabell published in 1919. It is a humorous romp through a medieval cosmos, including a send-up of Arthurian legend, and excursions to Heaven and Hell as in The Divine Comedy.

== Book and its reception ==
The eponymous hero, who considers himself a "monstrous clever fellow," embarks on a journey through ever more fantastic realms in search of a parodized version of courtly love. Everywhere he goes he meets eccentric knights and damsels, in an acerbic satire of contemporary America. Jurgen gains the attention of the Lady of the Lake, Queen Guinevere, Anaitis, Helen of Troy, Chloris, and even the Devil's wife. His wanderings take him from Poictesme to Glathion, Cocaigne, Leuke, Hell, and Heaven.

The novel became more widely known after the New York Society for the Suppression of Vice attempted to bring a prosecution for obscenity. The printing plates were seized on January 4, 1920. The case went on for two years before Cabell and his publisher, Robert M. McBride, won. They argued that the "indecencies" were double entendres that also had perfectly decent interpretations, though it appeared that what had actually offended the prosecution most was the work's mocking expression of philosophy, including a jest about the nature of papal infallibility. Deems Taylor composed Jurgen: A Symphonic Poem for Orchestra (1925) for a dramatic reading of Jurgen.

In 1922, Guy Holt, his editor and publisher who was also named in the court case, published Jurgen and the Law, A Statement. With Exhibits, including the Court's Opinion, and the brief for the Defendants on Motion to Direct an Acquittal. There were 1,080 numbered copies printed, with only one thousand for sale. Cabell took an author's revenge. In 1920, he published The Judging of Jurgen, a short description in which the hero is placed on trial by the Philistines, with a large tumblebug as the chief prosecutor, which was appended to the Foreword in later editions of Jurgen. He also wrote a short book, Taboo, in which he thanked John S. Sumner and the Society for the Suppression of Vice for generating the publicity that gave his career a boost.

he Pacific Review in 1921, Vernon Louis Parrington praised Jurgen, and described Cabell as "one of the greatest masters of English prose." Aleister Crowley called Jurgen one of the "epoch-making masterpieces of philosophy" in 1929 – the book contains a parody of Crowley's Gnostic Mass. Crowley's famous phrase from The Book of the Law, "There is no law beyond Do what thou wilt"—or its source, Rabelais's "there was but this one clause to be observed, Do What Thou Wilt"—is parodied as "There is no law in Cocaigne save, Do that which seems good to you." Reviewing Cabell's later novel, Hamlet Had An Uncle, Basil Davenport called Jurgen "a masterpiece."

Cabell's work is recognized as a landmark in the creation of the comic fantasy novel, influencing Terry Pratchett and many others. Robert A. Heinlein consciously patterned his best-known novel, Stranger in a Strange Land, after Jurgen, and Cabell's influence is also evident in the titles and themes of at least two other novels by Heinlein: his long-unpublished first novel, For Us, The Living: A Comedy of Customs (written 1938, published 2003), and his late work Job: A Comedy of Justice (1984). Filmmaker Jürgen Vsych was named after Jurgen: A Comedy of Justice, which was her father's favorite book.
