= Robert M. McBride =

American publisher and author (1879–1970)

- Robert M. McBride, 1937
- Born: August 24, 1879; McKeesport, Pennsylvania, U.S.
- Died: April 10, 1970 (aged 90); Philadelphia, Pennsylvania, U.S.
- Resting place: West Laurel Hill Cemetery, Bala Cynwyd, Pennsylvania, U.S.
- Occupation: Publisher
- Known for: -Co-founded McBride Winston and Company and McBride, Nast & Co. publishing firms -Founded Robert M. McBride and Company and Medill McBride publishing firms -Wrote several travel and other books
- Awards: Order of the White Lion 4th class from Czechoslovakia (1932)

Robert Medill McBride (August 24, 1879 – April 10, 1970) was an American publisher and author. He co-founded the publishing firm McBride Winston and Company in 1910. He partnered with Condé Nast in 1911 to form McBride, Nast & Co. He founded the Robert M. McBride and Company publishing firm in 1915. He sold the firm to the Outlet Book Company in 1949 and founded the publishing firm Medill McBride.

He wrote several travel and other books under his own name and the pen names Robert Medill and Marshall Reid. In November 1932, he was awarded the Order of the White Lion 4th class from Czechoslovakia for his travel book Romantic Czechoslovakia.

== Early life ==
McBride was born April 24, 1879, in McKeesport, Pennsylvania, to Samuel and Wilhelmina (Medill) McBride. He was educated in public schools in Brooklyn, New York.

== Career ==
He worked at Doubleday, Page & Co. from 1901 to 1906. He was an assistant advertising manager for The World's Work and Country Life and business manager for The Garden. He founded Yachting in 1906 and purchased House and Garden in 1909. He co-founded the publishing firm McBride Winston and Company in 1910 and purchased Travel.

He partnered with Condé Nast in 1911 to form McBride, Nast & Co. They purchased Lippincott's Monthly Magazine in 1915, renamed it McBride's Magazine, and merged it with Scribner's Magazine in 1916. After McBride and Nast separated, they remained on good terms, and McBride attended the wedding of Nast's son, Charles Coudert Nast, in 1928.

Robert McBride & Co. logo - 1929

He founded the New York based publishing firm Robert M. McBride and Company in 1915. Among the books he published were the later works of Frank Buck, including Buck's autobiography, All In A Lifetime. He wrote several travel and other books under his own name and the pen names Robert Medill and Marshall Reid.

Robert M. McBride and Dorothy Frooks, Stork Club, 1952

McBride published James Branch Cabell's twelfth book, Jurgen, A Comedy of Justice (1919), which was the subject of a celebrated obscenity case shortly after its publication. The hero, Jurgen, who considers himself a "monstrous clever fellow", embarks on a journey through ever more fantastic realms, even to hell and heaven. Everywhere he goes, he winds up seducing the local women, including the Devil's wife.

The novel was denounced by the New York Society for the Suppression of Vice; which attempted to bring a prosecution for obscenity. The case went on for two years before Cabell and McBride won: the "indecencies" were double entendres that also had a perfectly decent interpretation, though it appeared that what had actually offended the prosecution most was a joke about papal infallibility.

In November 1932, McBride received the Order of the White Lion 4th class from Czechoslovakia for his travel book Romantic Czechoslovakia.

He declared bankruptcy (chapter XI), October 27, 1948. He sold the Robert M. McBride and Company firm to the Outlet Book Company in 1949 and founded the publishing firm Medill McBride. In 1951, he resigned from Medill McBride.

He was a director at the Hamilton National Bank and the Hamilton Safe Deposit Company. He was a member of the Dutch Treat Club, The Players Club, and the Royal Societies Club.

He died April 10, 1970, in Philadelphia and was interred at West Laurel Hill Cemetery in Bala Cynwyd, Pennsylvania.

== Bibliography ==
- Robert Medill McBride and Neil Pritchie. Great Hoaxes of All Time. Robert M. McBride, New York, 1956.
- Robert Medill McBride. Towns and People of Modern Poland. Robert M. McBride, New York, 1938.
- Robert Medill McBride. Towns and People of Modern Germany. Robert M. McBride, New York, 1936.
- Robert Medill McBride. Romantic Czechoslovakia. Robert M. McBride, New York, 1930.
- Robert Medill McBride. Furnishing with Antiques. Robert M. McBride, New York, 1939.
- Robert Medill McBride. Spanish Towns and People. Robert M. McBride, New York, 1928.
- Robert Medill McBride. A Treasury of Antiques. Robert M. McBride, New York, 1946.
- Robert Medill McBride. A Little Book of Brittany. Robert M. McBride, New York, 1913
- Robert Medill McBride. Hilltop Cities of Italy. Robert M. McBride, New York, 1936.
- Robert Medill McBride. Norwegian Towns and People: Vistas in the Land of the Midnight Sun. Robert M. McBride, New York, 1927.
- Marshall Reid (pseudonym of Robert Medill McBride). Horses and Dogs of Great Men. Robert M. McBride, New York, 1952.
- Marshall Reid ed. (pseudonym of Robert Medill McBride). When You Build. Robert M. McBride, New York. 1946.
- Robert Medill (pseudonym of Robert Medill McBride). Sweden and its People. Robert M. McBride, New York. 1926.
- Robert Medill (pseudonym of Robert Medill McBride). Finland and its People. Robert M. McBride, New York. 1926.
